= List of Grizzly Tales for Gruesome Kids episodes =

Grizzly Tales for Gruesome Kids is a British animated series based on the generic trademarked book series by Jamie Rix. After the first four books were published from 1990 to 2001, Carlton Television adapted the short stories into ten-minute cartoons for ITV, produced by themselves, Honeycomb Productions, and Rix's production company, Elephant Productions, as well as Grizzly TV. It aired on CITV between January 2000 and October 2006 with six series and 78 episodes, as well as a New Year's Eve special that was over 20 minutes longer than other episodes. The series returned in a new format for Nicktoons UK with 26 episodes split into two series under the name Grizzly Tales (also known as Grizzly Tales: Cautionary Tales for Lovers of Squeam!), which aired between May 2011 and November 2012.

Both versions of the series have been nominated for BAFTAs and the CITV series has received numerous international awards from animated film festivals. Both have been popular on their respective channels; the CITV series has often been re-aired on Nickelodeon with the Nicktoons series. The CITV cartoon was available for purchase on DVD in the UK and Northern Ireland, as well as Porchlight Entertainment in North America and Time Life's Shock Records in Australia and New Zealand. The Nickelodeon cartoon was later released on DVD through the same respective companies, however, it was released in the UK and Northern Ireland with Abbey Home Media.

== Series overview ==
The following dates included are borrowed from the TV Episode Calendar, (Note: Many websites vary on the date of the airing: e.g. Amazon Prime USA lists "Jamie's School Dinners" as airing on 1 May 2010, but TV Episode Calendar lists it as airing on 18 September 2007. TV Episode Calendar is more accurate because the first and last episode of the first series are identical to the dates that Honeycomb Productions have.) Newspapers.com, and the official Grizzly Tales/Honeycomb Productions website.

Grizzly Tales for Gruesome Kids
Series	Episodes	Originally released		
Series	Episodes	First released	Last released	Network
1	13	4 January 2000	27 March 2000	CITV
2	13	9 April 2001	27 April 2001	CITV
3	12	10 December 2002	4 March 2003	CITV
4	14	2 April 2004	31 December 2004	CITV
5	13	27 March 2006	12 April 2006	CITV
6	13	20 September 2006	20 October 2006	CITV

Grizzly Tales: Cautionary Tales for Lovers of Squeam!
Series	Episodes	Originally released		
Series	Episodes	First released	Last released	Network
1	13	2 May 2011	10 May 2011	NickToons UK
2	13	5 September 2011	2 November 2012	NickToons UK

== Series 1 (2000) ==
All episodes were produced in 1998 and 1999.

No. overall	No. in series	Title	Story title	Book origin	Creatures in the Popcorn Bucket	Original release date	Changes
1	1	"The New Nanny"	The New Nanny	Grizzly Tales for Gruesome Kids	Beetles	4 January 2000	The confrontation between the parents and the alligator isn't shown.
Mrs. Frightfully-Busy telephones an animal nanny agency to hire a nanny to look after her secretly-scheming children, Tristram and Candy.: Fate: They end up being killed by their nanny (Only implied).
2	2	"The Spaghetti Man"	The Spaghetti Man	Grizzly Tales for Gruesome Kids	Worms	11 January 2000	Some of Timothy's vandalism when he is home alone are not included in the episode. Timothy does not react to the Spaghetti Man's first attack and continues behaving badly, possibly to avoid being captured by him.
Timothy King throws violent tantrums at mealtimes and is visited by an invisible, shadowy, flour-smelling entity with uncooked spaghetti fingers.: Fate : Timothy ends up being turned into a lasagna by the spaghetti man.
3	3	"Grandmother's Footsteps"	Grandmother's Footsteps	Ghostly Tales for Ghastly Kids	Beetles	18 January 2000	TBA
Jolyon is terrified when he spots a shadow outside his bedroom window. His grandmother decides to calm him down with a story, which suspiciously relates to current events.: Fate : It's revealed that Jolyon and his Grandmother had died years ago.
4	4	"Death By Chocolate"	Death By Chocolate	Fearsome Tales for Fiendish Kids	Flies	24 January 2000	The chocolate company's boardroom scene is not included, possibly to shorten the time length of the episode.
Serena Slurp is a chocoholic who blackmails her little sister into becoming her slave when she catches her sibling accidentally breaking their mother's fly swatter.: Fate: She eats a maggot inside a chocolate bunny and the maggot turns Serena in a chocolate fly that ends up being killed by her sister with the fly swatter.
5	5	"The Wooden Hill"	The Wooden Hill	Grizzly Tales for Gruesome Kids	Worms	31 January 2000	A piece of chicken is shown in the cartoon, possibly because the 3rd-degree burns would be too graphic.
Irritated with her son's restless behaviour, Jack's mother agrees to read him a story, but the book is in a room at the top of the stairs in the dark corridor.: Fate : Jack brings back Dracula for his mother to read for his bedtime story.
6	6	"A Tangled Web"	A Tangled Web	Ghostly Tales for Ghastly Kids	Slugs	7 February 2000	Nigel's mother isn't seen kissing her son goodnight. The window is open in the cartoon, but it's closed in the book.
Nigel abuses spiders to become "Black Widow Nigel", but one pregnant spider named Ariadne is avenged by the ghosts of her babies that wrap their webs around in his chest. When his parents became annoyed with his facial tics, he promised not to open his mouth again.: Fate: Nigel's organs get webbed up by ghost baby spiders he promises to not open his mouth again and takes up knitting and was turned into a spider.
7	7	"The Princess's Clothes"	The Princess's Clothes	Grizzly Tales for Gruesome Kids	Flies	14 February 2000	The scenes of Felicity being at school aren't shown, possibly to shorten the time length of the episode.
Felicity Folfax is a mischievous girl who loves being spoiled by her father and is forced to wear "horrible" clothes that her mother has bought from a travelling saleslady named Mrs. Shears. But at night, she's secretly a witch who uses magic scissors to cut Felicity's fancy outfits and also change her ways.: Fate: Felicity goes to school the next day wearing nothing but a blanket.
8	8	"Burgerskip"	Burgers	Ghostly Tales for Ghastly Kids	Beetles	21 February 2000	Oswald O'Berger is a cowboy, rather than a clown. Seamus's name has been changed to Oswald O'Burger.
Oswald "The Happy Cowboy" O'Berger, the CEO of the successful fast food chain Burgerskip, wants to expand his business by bulldozing the Amazon rainforest, but a representative of an Amazonian tribe begs him to reconsider because of an ancient tree shrine located in the bulldozing path.: Fate: Oswald the happy cowboy O'Berger is taken into the clouds by the spirit of Panacheck.
9	9	"The Barber of Civil"	The Barber of Civil	Grizzly Tales for Gruesome Kids	Slugs	28 February 2000	Tanya's full name is not included (i.e. Tanya Wilson). The Barber does not lick a haircut utensil, due to the scene being removed for being graphic.
Tanya and Peregrine are the rudest children in their school, which attracts the attention of a popular local barber.: Fate: Peregrine and Tanya become kinder then ever after the barber cuts the rude bits of their tongues out.
10	10	"The Chipper Chums Go Scrumping"	The Chipper Chums Go Scrumping	Fearsome Tales for Fiendish Kids	Worms	6 March 2000	Aunt Fanny, Uncle Herbert, Sam's mother, Ginger and Alice's mother, and Dick Stick's mother do not appear in the episode. In the episode, Stinker survives a gunshot to one of his legs.
Best friends Algy and Col visit Algy's extended family in Kent with Algy's pet dog, Stinker, in search of a summer adventure. They go on a picnic with three of the neighborhood kids (Ginger and sister Alice, and Sam) and agree to scrump from a nearby apple orchard, owned by a shotgun-wielding, cider-making farmer.: Fate: The Chipper Chums are pressed into cider by Farmer Tregowan.
11	11	"The History Lesson"	A Lesson From History	Ghostly Tales for Ghastly Kids	Slugs	13 March 2000	The title is changed. Eliza's name is changed to Elizabeth.
Elizabeth McGregor panics during a history exam because she had no desire to prepare for it. The ghost of a schoolgirl named Penny approaches her to keep her company.: Fate: Elizabeth McGregor ends up dead last on the results for the exam because Penny was just as stupid and lazy as Elizabeth was.
12	12	"Sweets"	Sweets	Grizzly Tales for Gruesome Kids	Flies	20 March 2000	Thomas says gumboils instead of sticks of rock, different from the book.
Thomas Ratchet embarrasses his mother when he misbehaves in supermarkets. After being banned from yet another supermarket, Thomas runs away until he stops by an old-fashioned sweet shop. When he's turned into a shop dummy, his conscience gets the better of him.: Fate: Thomas Ratchet gets put in the sweets shop window after becoming a mannequin and waiting for the day his mother will recognize him.
13	13	"Dr. Moribundus"	Doctor Moribundus	Fearsome Tales for Fiendish Kids	Beetles	27 March 2000	The doctor's operation is not shown onscreen, due to it being graphic.
Lorelei Lee pretends to be ill every week of the school term until an emergency doctor recommends Dr. Moribundus who changes her ways by performing brain surgery.: Fate: Lorelei Lee goes to school the next day after Dr Moribundus cures her extreme no-school itis.

== Series 2 (2001) ==
All episodes were produced in 1998 and 1999.

No. overall	No. in series	Title	Story title	Book origin	Creatures in the Popcorn Bucket	Original release date	Changes
14	1	"Jack in a Box"	Jack in a Box	Fearsome Tales for Fiendish Kids	Worms	9 April 2001	To punish Jack for annoying people, Mr. Twig-tailor seals him in a magic wooden box in the episode. In the original story, Mr. Frankenstein decapitates him with a large axe.
The Honourable Jack Delaunay de Havilland De Trop annoys his parents because he constantly interrupts other people's private conversations. As a result, a popular ventriloquist named Mr. Twig-tailor gives him a taste of his own medicine by turning him into a dummy with a magic box.: Fate: Jack gets turned into a ventriloquist dummy by Mr Twig Tailor and is given as a present to his sister Rosie.
15	2	"Glued to the Telly"	Glued to the Telly	Grizzly Tales for Gruesome Kids	Worms	10 April 2001	In the book, Herbert is addicted to cola, but the episode doesn't mention it.
Herbert Hinckley is a television addict who literally gets stuck inside his television and must find a way out. Otherwise, he will turn into a crisp. Note: An episode and characters from Wolves, Witches and Giants make a few brief appearances in this episode.: Fate: Herbert burns to a crisp in the Tv after being put in the oven by a chef.
16	3	"Cat Burgler (Note: Spelt like this in the episode's title card.)"	The Cat Burglar	Fearsome Tales for Fiendish Kids	Beetles	11 April 2001	Fedora does not go to school in this episode. The original story featured her con-woman antics. Tiddles is not hit by a car because it was too violent for the cartoon. Her corpse lands in front of Fedora instead. The £10 reward is changed to a £5,000 reward. The title has been shortened.
Successful con-artist Fedora Funklefink spots a poster for a missing cat and tries any scam she can think of to get the £10 reward as well as the £5,000 reward. When she finds the real cat flattened on the ground due to a fall, she turns it into a puppet and finally gets her treasure. After finding a poster about a missing tiger named Tiggor, she's gobbled up by him until a ringmaster from a downtown circus arrives just in time.: Fate: Fedora is eaten alive by Tiggor the tiger.
17	4	"Mr. Peeler's Butterflies"	Mr. Peeler's Butterflies	Fearsome Tales for Fiendish Kids	Slugs	12 April 2001	Alexander's father threatens that Mr. Peeler will appear if he doesn't go to sleep. In the original story, both parents went into his bedroom after receiving a visit from him. In the episode, they've already fallen asleep when Mr. Peeler was about to appear in Alexander's bedroom. Mr. Peeler doesn't mention his name either. The eyelid removal scene is removed due to it being disturbing.
Alexander hates going to bed and torments his parents so that he can grab a few extra seconds, but a magical old man will take him on that offer.: Fate: Alexander's eyelids are removed by Mr Peeler and its implied he died of insomnia
18	5	"An Elephant Never Forgets"	An Elephant Never Forgets	Ghostly Tales for Ghastly Kids	Flies	17 April 2001	In the book, the elephant calf has severe bleeding due to the amputation. In the cartoon, the wound is fully healed. Belinda and her brother aren't seen wishing about not having a bath before bed and going to school. The cartoon doesn't mention the parents filing for a divorce.
Belinda and Percy Crumpdump wanted an elephant, so their father had one trophy-hunted and brought back the foot of a calf instead. To get the finer things in life, Percy and his sister remove the objects from the foot while making a wish. But when the elephant calf tried to escape from the house, it accidentally lost its balance and fell down the staircase, crushing both kids to death and turning them into ghosts. Unfortunately, it was also turned into a ghost due to the incident.: Fate: Belinda and Percy Crumpdump are both flattened like pancakes after wishing for the three-legged elephant calf to be revived.
19	6	"The Childhood Snatcher"	The Childhood Snatcher	Grizzly Tales for Gruesome Kids	Worms	18 April 2001	In the original story, the Childhood Snatcher was an elderly man with a black hooded cloak. In the episode, he retains the same appearance but is a witch-like entity. The first argument between Betty and Amos isn't shown.
Amos Stirling wants to become famous so when his daughter is born, he prepares her for fame. However, this secretly attracts an old man, known as the Childhood Snatcher, who visits Amos's daughter the night before each birthday and removes her hair. When Betty finds her daughter being turned into a pale old lady, she's understandably furious at her husband.: Fate : Albert Stirling is implied to have died of old age.
20	7	"The Giant Who Grew Too Big For His Boots"	The Giant Who Grew Too Big For His Boots	Grizzly Tales for Gruesome Kids	Worms	19 April 2001	In the book, Hugh is a married man. In the cartoon, he's the son of a single mother.
Huge Hugh the giant wakes up and finds himself constantly growing due to not having enough space. When a satellite's spikes pierce one of the acid spots on his tongue, he's shrunken to the size of a mouse and asked a snail if he can use his shell as shelter. The snail simply refused and knocked him down to the wet soil in the rain.: Fate: Huge Hugh shrinks down to teeny size and is then oozed on by a snail
21	8	"Prince Noman"	Prince Noman	Fearsome Tales for Fiendish Kids	Slugs	20 April 2001	TBA
A Newborn prince starts to turn invisible after his father, the king, misreads his chosen name at the naming ceremony. After the king passes away from old age, an Irish seamstress copies multiple parts of the family to make a new face for her son.: Fate: Prince Noman disappeared because King Norman called him "Noman" but Letitia removed the distinct pieces of her family the guards then smashed every mirror in the castle.
22	9	"Tag"	Tag	Ghostly Tales for Ghastly Kids	Flies	23 April 2001	The school P.E. kit belonged to Jim Spectre, instead of A. Phantom. The final tag is on the front of Terry's neck.
Terry Blotch envies a schoolmate's popularity, which turns him into a kleptomaniac. When tags appeared on his body, he confesses to the theft and never stole anything again.: Fate: Terry Blotch returns Jim Specter's gym kit and learns to never steal again.
23	10	"The Litter Bug"	The Litter Bug	Grizzly Tales for Gruesome Kids	Beetles	24 April 2001	Bunty communicates through body language in the episode, while she speaks full sentences in the book. The confrontation between Colonel Buffy and Bunty isn't shown.
Bunty Porker becomes the UK's public enemy because her littering is causing a state of emergency. But a swarm of starving insects catch her first before the British Army could lay a finger on Bunty.: Fate: Bunty is eaten alive by the Big Black Bugs of Britain.
24	11	"Fat Boy with a Trumpet"	Fat Boy with a Trumpet	Fearsome Tales for Fiendish Kids	Slugs	25 April 2001	Johnny is reduced to a pile of ashes by the lightning. In the cartoon, Johnny appears as a well-built young adult, different from his counterpart in the book, but retains the same attitude.
School bully Johnny Bullneck has a new target: an overweight, bespectacled boy named Timothy with a trumpet case. However, when a cricket game goes awry, Mother Nature decides to turn the tables when a flash of lightning turns him into dust. Miraculously, this particular force of nature saved Timothy's life. And thus, the students of the school lived in harmony once again as they sang a song about Johnny Bullneck.: Fate: Johnny Bullneck turns to ash after lightning strikes while he's playing Timothy's trumpet.
25	12	"The Broken Down Cottage"	The Broken Down Cottage	Ghostly Tales for Ghastly Kids	Flies	26 April 2001	Augustus's grandfather isn't mentioned in the cartoon.
Augustus Flich ran away from home and moves into a cottage with a boy named Arthur in the middle of a creepy countryside. Due to boredom, they decide to prank call the emergency services. When Augustus's parents find him in the burnt cottage, he explains that a fire turned him into a ghost, similar to Arthur.: Fate: Augustus and Arthur are burned alive after a log rolled from the fire.
26	13	"Well'ard Willard"	Well'ard Willard	Fearsome Tales for Fiendish Kids	Worms	27 April 2001	Willard melted completely instead of the skin shedding, since the latter process was too graphic.
In order to impress his "fans", Willard claims that he stole the sun and has it hidden at home, but a girl in the audience dares him to prove it. Instead of telling the truth, he chose to spin a web of lies, only to learn that it would be his ruination. And that is how the sunlight turned Willard into a small puddle of water in his bedroom.: Fate: Willard turns into water because of the sun.

== Series 3 (2002–2003) ==
Despite the second half being aired in 2003, all episodes were produced in 2002.

No. overall	No. in series	Title	Story title	Book origin	Creatures in the Popcorn Bucket	Original release date	Changes
27	1	"The Upset Stomach"	The Upset Stomach	More Grizzly Tales for Gruesome Kids	Flies	1 July 2002	Ethel is not rescued from an overeating accident, due to her father fetching some indigestion tablets for the 2nd stomach.
A gluttonous girl named Ethel Turnip asks for another stomach to continue eating, but when she gets bored and mistreats it, it plots its revenge by spraying deadly acids across the town in order to make her pay. By the time Ethel's father tried to save her, it was too late. The stomach named Rover spat out one of her shoes, much to her parents shock.: Fate: Ethel is eaten by Rover (her second stomach) along with her parents
28	2	"Knock Down Ginger"	Knock Down Ginger	More Grizzly Tales For Gruesome Kids	Slugs	22 July 2002	Milo's sister Eliza (nicknamed "Lizzy the Lizard", because of her lisp) does not appear, implying that Milo is an only child. Ginger's character model in the cartoon looks different from his description in the story (e.g. tall and overweight.); Mr Thripps is never referred to as a retired entomologist, possibly to keep the details private.
The residents of Nimby resent the eldest resident, Mr. Thripps, because of his unattractive garden full of insects. His neighbor, Ginger Pie, and his friend Milo decide to scare him out of town through malicious pranks, including Knock Down Ginger. When Ginger returned home after failing the prank, he pressed a doorbell which allowed a group of termites to give him his just desserts. Thus, they slept peacefully while Ginger's family home collapsed when his mother slammed the front door.: Fate: Ginger pie is eaten from the inside out by Mr Thripps termites.
29	3	"The Locked Door"	The Locked Door	Ghostly Tales for Ghastly Kids	Worms	20 December 2002	The daughter's name is changed from Rosie to Ishbel.
A deaf couple named Matt and Jodie from New Zealand buy a house with a haunted room. It attracts their young daughter, Ishbel, who is the only one who can hear the room's strange noises. When she opened the door in a state of curiosity, she found an old man who explained why he'd been locked in the room for a long time. He said that he wanted revenge on the perpetrator who left him to die from starvation. As they were having cake together, the 115-year-old man vanished and continued his quest for vengeance elsewhere.: Fate:The 115-year old man disappears because he's a ghost because he died of starvation.
30	4	"Simon Sulk"	Simon Sulk	Fearsome Tales for Fiendish Kids	Slugs	23 December 2002	In the episode, both parents eat Simon when they've had enough of his sulking after turning into trolls. In the story, one of the trolls decapitated him to shut him up. The house fire scene isn't shown.
A moody boy named Simon barricades himself in his room to avoid moving to a new town when he gets in a sulk, unaware of Icelandic trolls out to get him. When he opened his bedroom door, he thought it was an act at first, until his parents transformed into trolls and ate him before moving to another house.: Fate: Simon is eaten by his troll parents.
31	5	"The Urban Fox"	The Urban Fox	More Grizzly Tales For Gruesome Kids	Flies	24 December 2002	The children of the fox-hunting couple do not exist in the original story. Their "parents" are the original antagonists. There is no mention of the property damage bill that the council sent to the hunting couple after they left in disgrace.
An upper-middle-class family move into a council estate and their children confront the new neighbours when they spot a fox named Elvis in their garden. It is actually the neighbours' pet, but the children insist that they should surrender the fox but when the neighbours refuse, the children decide to hunt it down. But the kids' efforts didn't work, so they hide in the sewers to avoid being caught by the police, while Elvis and his owner lived happily ever after.: Fate: Piers and Tamara Blunderbuss live in the sewers because of the cops, due to Piers and Tamara destroying the neighborhood while chasing Elvis (the fox).
32	6	"When the Bed Bugs Bite"	When the Bed Bugs Bite	More Grizzly Tales For Gruesome Kids	Beetles	26 December 2002	In the cartoon, the saliva is a yellowish-green colour. In one scene of the episode, Hannibal bites the headmistress's leg before he gets kicked out of school.
A boy named Hannibal whose biting habit brings him to an early demise when a bug exterminator is called into town. Even his own parents lived in fear of their own son, which isn't uncommon.: Fate: Hannibal is split in two by a shoe by an exterminator.
33	7	"Spoilsport"	Spoilsport	More Grizzly Tales For Gruesome Kids	Beetles	30 December 2002	TBA
The Tooth Fairy exacts her revenge on Girl Pinchgut, the daughter of the meanest family in Britain who insists on telling lies and ruining the magic around her younger brother, Baby. When she's invited to her castle, Girl's fate is sealed when a bacterial liquid consumes her body and reduces her to rancid brown sludge. Meanwhile, her little brother is finally safe from her verbally abusive behaviour.: Fate: Girl is eaten by bacteria, due to being the only one with teeth.
34	8	"The Pie Man"	The Pie Man	More Grizzly Tales For Gruesome Kids	Worms	30 December 2002	In the book, Donald's mother pulls the dummy out with a monkey wrench. In the cartoon, she pulls it out with one of her hands.
A youngster named Donald learns the hard way that constant thumb-sucking is not only a quick way to lose friends, but a shortcut to disaster. As the Pie Man visits the house that night, he tries to stop Donald from sucking his thumbs all the time but got frustrated after a few attempts. When that didn't work, he decided to put him in a pie before riding off on a bicycle to escape.: Fate: Donald is baked into a pie by the pie man.
35	9	"Head in the Clouds"	Head In the Clouds	More Grizzly Tales For Gruesome Kids	Slugs	31 December 2002	Brian's dream of being Rapunzel isn't shown.
An inattentive boy named Brian spends all his time daydreaming until a day when he (literally) loses his head. When he asks a mechanic to stitch it back on, he discovers that there's clouds in his head instead of being on the outside. His head was sealed into a box as privacy and protection, much to his parents confusion. But the key and ticket fell accidentally into a crooked board in the floor of the Body Shop.: Fate: Brian's head is stuck in a box because he lost the key.
36	10	"Dirty Bertie"	Dirty Bertie	More Grizzly Tales For Gruesome Kids	Flies	31 December 2002	Tharg was renamed Foot
A dirty boy named Bertie refuses to be clean and presentable. After his parents fail numerous times to make him turn his unhygienic life around, an alien crash-lands in the garden, who mistakes him for an astronaut due to his bad hygiene. Once Bertie was sent away to marry an ugly mistress, the alien had finally found shelter and got away from his captors after he accidentally kissed her.: Fate: Bertie is taken into space to marry Putrid.
37	11	"Crocodile Tears"	Crocodile Tears	More Grizzly Tales For Gruesome Kids	Worms	7 January 2003	TBA
A girl named Gwendolyn "Weepy Wen" Howling who uses tears to get her way attracts the attention of an angry crocodile. When a small duckling warns her about it, Wen became ignorant and smacked it, killing it instantly until the same reptilian seals her fate by swallowing her whole, much to her parents dismay.: Fate: Gwendolyn is eaten alive by Sakusake the old croc.
38	12	"Little Fingers"	Little Fingers	Fearsome Tales for Fiendish Kids	Beetles	14 January 2003	In the cartoon, the man lets Daffyd live instead of beating him unconscious with his gun. He returns home with a thumb on one of his hands in the book. The man's appearance isn't shown in the cartoon, possibly to keep his identity private. In the book, Daffyd has a deformed thumb, possibly due to a condition or an injury.
A boy named Daffyd Thomas who is never able to keep his fingers to himself decides to order pizza from an Italian restaurant he has never heard of, only to have his fingers on both hands amputated by the kidnapper during a scam. Secretly, his parents were rather pleased.: Fate: Daffyd's fingers are chopped off by the mob.

== Series 4 (2004–2005) ==
Despite being first aired in 2004, the first 14 episodes were originally produced in 2002.

No. overall	No. in series	Title	Story title	Book origin	Creatures in the Popcorn Bucket	Original release date	Changes
39	1	"Revenge of the Bogeyman"	Revenge of the Bogeyman	More Grizzly Tales For Gruesome Kids	Beetles	2 April 2004	TBA
Dee enjoys picking her nose, but her addiction pulls out the Bogeyman, who teaches her the hard way that bogeys have feelings too. Today, she scratches her ears, but is about to meet the Wax Woman, who will teach her the same lesson if she pulls her out.: Fate: Dee learns her lesson about picking her nose and starts picking her ears instead.
40	2	"It's Only a Game, Sport!"	It's Only a Game, Sport!	More Grizzly Tales For Gruesome Kids	Flies	2 April 2004	TBA
Bruce is a violent sore loser whose vengeful antics get him expelled from school and eaten by rattlesnakes as punishment for his false bravado, which is what happened after he insulted his younger sister, Kitty.: Fate: Bruce is eaten alive by rattlesnakes
41	3	"The People Potter"	The People Potter	More Grizzly Tales For Gruesome Kids	Worms	16 April 2004	The People Potter's real name isn't mentioned in the episode.
A clumsy and destructive schoolgirl is petrified solid once the statue broke, revealing the People Potter in it after she found a button for her cardigan in her home, which was smashed and broken by her clumsiness. Surprisingly, she managed to keep the vase intact while her parents were out of the house.: Fate: Greta is potterified by the People Potter.
42	4	"The Gas Man Cometh"	The Gas Man Cometh	More Grizzly Tales For Gruesome Kids	Flies	16 April 2004	Stefan's surname isn't mentioned in the cartoon.
A practical joker pays the price for making repeated hoax phone calls and spends the rest of his days in space, wishing he hadn't been such a gasbag after meeting the Gas Man who puts a stop to his unfunny prank calls by using helium to send him into the galaxy.: Fate: Stefan gets stuck holding on to a telephone satellite in space.
43	5	"Bogman"	Bogman	Ghostly Tales for Ghastly Kids	Worms	TBA	In the book, Helen throws a comic book to her father. In the cartoon, her brother throws the comic book to stop Bogman from completing his revenge.
A lazy girl who prefers sitting on the toilet reading comics to helping with the washing-up is approached by the bog body of a violent Stone Age man who is looking for his killers. When her family went into the bathroom, he tries to end the pain by attacking them until his vengeful vendetta came to an end after being hit by a spear. A few weeks later, she cleaned the house up by throwing the peat away by using a bucket.: Fate: Helen helps her family get rid of the peat that the house got filled with.
44	6	"Bunny Boy"	Bunny Boy	More Grizzly Tales For Gruesome Kids	Worms	TBA	Bill doesn't say Bugs Bunny's catchphrase in the cartoon.
A boy named Bill who won't eat his greens has a nasty accident involving a combine harvester and a rabbit. After a long stay in the hospital, he and Tubs were combined into a bunny-like hybrid who does what his mother had always wanted, but he still had parts of the bicycle in his body after the incident.: Fate: Bill becomes half-bunny half-man half-bicycle after an accident with a combine harvester.
45	7	"Bessy O'Messy"	Bessy O'Messy	Fearsome Tales for Fiendish Kids	Worms	2004	TBA
An untidy girl is taken by leprechauns to be their housekeeper. After refusing to be their housekeeper, much to Bessy’s horror, they reveal that they are meat-eaters with retractable claws. Miraculously, her polite brother saves her by using a washing machine to wash the leprechauns away. She starts to change for the better and decides to help her brother, which turned out to be a very tough task for a kid to do because of sibling rivalry.: Fate: Bessy shrinks down after getting in the washing machine after escaping the leprechauns.
46	8	"Goblin Mountain"	Goblin Mountain	Grizzly Tales for Gruesome Kids	Slugs	2004	In the book, the boy's name is Joseph, however in the cartoon, it's shortened to just Joe. Also, unlike in the book where Joe is last mentioned simply going to bed, in the cartoon, the final animated scene shows him actually being turned into a tree the next day. Uncle Grizzly even confirms this at the end as well, calling him "rather heavy these days, and taking undercover".
A boy with no respect for literature is buried alive by goblins intent on turning him into a tree, and then become a book as a way of punishing him. It turned out to be a dream, and he promised not to rip them apart again, only to be turned into a tree the next day as punishment by the Goblins and the judge when they found him guilty.: Fate: Joe Alexander becomes a tree and, as Uncle Grizzly mentions, he's rather heavy these days, and taking undercover, so Joe gets turned into a book.
47	9	"Superstitious Nonsense"	Superstitious Nonsense	More Grizzly Tales For Gruesome Kids	Beetles	2004	Her name was Pylon in the story. In the episode, it's changed to Araminta Jane.
A superstitious girl meets an untimely end in a way she could never have predicted.: Fate: Araminta Jane is crushed to death by a cow on her grave is a poem that goes like this: here lies Araminta Jane, superstitiously insane, fought her demons, lost the battle, went out in a storm of cattle, hopefully, she's gone for good and won't be coming back, touch wood.
48	10	"Athlete's Foot"	Athlete's Foot	Fearsome Tales for Fiendish Kids	Beetles	2004	Anthony isn't shown being turned into a pile of ashes by the bomb, due to the scene being graphic.
A pair of ordinary-seeming running shoes hide a sinister secret. Once the race was over, the truth had been revealed by an old man named Tommy Knock.: Fate: Anthony is blown to smithereens by a nuke from a ghost German bomber.
49	11	"The Stick Men"	The Stick Men	Fearsome Tales for Fiendish Kids	Flies	2004	TBA
A friendless youngster's drawings on a wall come to life and take him into their world, only to become a permanent resident when his unloving, uncaring, care more about work parents splash the drawings away with a bucket of water. Today, he lives happily ever after in the new world of his drawings while his parents get exactly what they deserve.: Fate: Chico stays in the drawing world forever and his abusive parents die in a freak helicopter accident.
50	12	"The Grass Monkey"	The Grass Monkey	More Grizzly Tales For Gruesome Kids	Slugs	2004	TBA
A poor boy falls in love with a girl who cares more for her hair than for him. When his "girlfriend" ate the magic seeds, her hair turned into grass which allowed an anorexic cow to make a full recovery. After the accident, he and his single mother became Millionaires and had their lives changing for the better.: Fate: Esmerelda is eaten alive by Ruby the cow and Spike uses Ruby as a freak show attraction called the mow cow the only cow to eat herself.
51	13	"The Top Hat"	The Top Hat	Grizzly Tales for Gruesome Kids	Slugs	2004	Benjamin says he has scorpions in the cartoon. In the book, he pretends to have pet spiders and worms. The magician has a young son.
A boy abuses the power of a magic hat after losing his previous hat but is taught a lesson when the object's gloved hand grabs him and refuses to let him go. In the hat, he tried to apologize for his behavior but the damage was already done when the magician tried to bring him back from it.: Fate: Benjamin gets pulled into the top hat by a giant gloved hand the magician couldn't bring him back because he used too much of the hats magic the only thing that comes out of the hat is Benjamin's voice trying to say sorry.
52	14	"The Decomposition of Delia Dethabridge"	The Decomposition of Delia Dethabridge	More Grizzly Tales For Gruesome Kids	Beetles	2004	In the book, Gormless is a troll. In the cartoon, he's a gremlin. He later leaves to write a book that's based on the Encyclopaedia Britannica. In the animated episode, Delia works at a cheesecake factory.
A careless and narcissistic girl, who refuses to do schoolwork by the thought that she's a genius, regrets leaving a story-book unread and unfinished when the character comes to life. With a lack of knowledge, she's sent to a cheesecake factory where she smells the meals to see if they're not cooked properly. NOTES: This is the last episode in the series to focus on traditional animation. This is the last episode to have Uncle Grizzly and Spindleshanks play around at the start and end of each episode.: Fate: Delia Dethabridge becomes a know nothing after Gormless the gremlin bursts both saddlebags of knowledge and Delia becomes a cheesecake smeller.
53	15	"A Grizzly New Year's Tale: The Crystal Eye"	The Crystal Eye	Blubbers and Sicksters	Slugs	31 December 2004	TBA
A spoiled and bratty boy is given a chance to redeem himself and be good like his twin brother by his altruistic reflection in a magic mirror, which was given to him by a Romani gypsy but is ultimately unable to control his selfishness and narcissism to the point it becomes his downfall. NOTES: This is the first episode to rely on Flash Animation, which the series started to do from this point on and onwards. Also from this point, Uncle Grizzly and Spindleshanks (in which he also became absent from this point) no longer goof around. Grizzly just starts the film straight after the kid eats whatever is in the popcorn box and a story will often jump straight to the credits after it ends. However, some episodes after that will occasionally show clips of Grizzly laughing during or at the end of an episode. This is the last episode to use the original theme song and the first episode to use the new one (which plays at the part where Grizzly takes out a film reel and at the end credits).: Fate: Fick is put inside the mirror and becomes a zombie while his better half lives with Finn and they go on a shopping trip to new York city

== Series 5 (2006) ==
Some episodes were produced in 2005.

No. overall	No. in series	Title	Story title	Book origin	Creatures in the Popcorn Bucket	Original release date	Changes
54	1	"The Bugaboo Bear"	The Bugaboo Bear	Terror Time Toys	Beetles	27 March 2006	TBA
A mistreated teddy bear named Cutie gets revenge on his owner, Emily Stiff, turning her into a toy that gets subjected to the same abuse from another girl.: Fate: Emily Stiff becomes a toy and is mistreated after getting fed sawdust by Cutie
55	2	"The Butcher Boy"	The Butcher Boy	Terror Time Toys	Flies	28 March 2006	The book mentions Gilbert's full name, but the cartoon doesn't.
A money-hungry boy named Gilbert Patrick uses bribed money to try and outperform other pupils' success. When a bike is stolen from the butcher's grandson, the tables are turned instantly.: Fate: Gilbert Patrick becomes sausages by Gideon Knucklebone
56	3	"The Fruit Bat"	The Fruit Bat	Nasty Little Beasts	Slugs	29 March 2006	TBA
A girl named Cherie Stone, who hates fruit, gets a grim lesson in healthy eating when a hungry fruit bat bites her and turns her into one.: Fate: Cherie stone becomes a fruit bat after a fruit bat bites her heart due to a plum In her pocket
57	4	"Monty's Python"	Monty's Python	Nasty Little Beasts	Flies	30 March 2006	The name of Monty's little sister isn't mentioned in the cartoon.
A teenage boy named Monty gets a python named SisterEater to terrorise his younger sister, only to end up making life worse for himself by feeding the python too many live animals.: Fate: Monty lives in the sewer and is now the pet of SisterEater
58	5	"The Grub A Blub Blub"	The Grub A Blub Blub	Nasty Little Beasts	Slugs	31 March 2006	TBA
A girl named Savannah Slumberson who loves lazing around is forced to go on a family holiday to a summer camp where her lie-ins aren't tolerated, and something strange happens to her sleeping bag.: Fate: Savannah Slumberson is cocooned by witchetty grubs in her sleeping bag and is taken by a museum curator to be an exhibit
59	6	"Wolf Child"	Wolf Child	Nasty Little Beasts	Worms	3 April 2006	TBA
A boy named Garth MacQueen acts like a baby to take attention away from his newborn sister Moira but attracts wolves who seek revenge over an ancestor of his centuries ago: Eagan MacQueen. Some people believe that the wolves raised Garth like one of their pups, while others think he's eaten alive by the pack. His fate remains a mystery to this day.: Fate: Garth turns into baby and is taken by wolves. The fate of Garth has remained a mystery. Was he eaten or did he become a pup?
60	7	"The Weather Witch"	The Weather Witch	Freaks of Nature	Slugs	4 April 2006	TBA
A cruel boy named Jack Frost, who picks on old people using snow and ice, is taught a lesson by the spirit of the weather: The Weather Witch.: Fate: Jack Frost melts after being frozen solid by the weather witch and the weather witch lifts the sun which melts Jack Frost and gives the snowdrops a drink.
61	8	"Kiss and Make Up"	Kiss and Make Up	The "Me!" Monsters	Beetles	5 April 2006	TBA
The evil personality of a two-faced fairy uses enchanted vanishing cream to steal the face of an insecure youngster named Holly Hotlips for herself and give her an ugly one in return.: Fate: Holly Hotlips's face is replaced by the ugly face of the two faced fairy.
62	9	"William the Conkerer"	William the Conkerer	Freaks of Nature	Slugs	6 April 2006	TBA
A boy named William, who breaks all the conker trees and steals all their conkers to win a competition, is devoured by a large conker sent to him by a vengeful, red-fingered hermit gardener.: Fate: William and his mother are eaten alive by the giant Canadian conker.
63	10	"Silence is Golden"	Silence is Golden	Gruesome Grown Ups	Flies	7 April 2006	TBA
A noisy girl named Dolores Bellicose, who never uses her indoor voice, is turned into a golden statue by two librarians who are sensitive to sound.: Fate: Dolores Bellicose becomes a golden statue and is sent to the bottom of the ocean by pirates.
64	11	"Her Majesty's Moley"	Her Majesty's Moley	Gruesome Grown Ups	Beetles	10 April 2006	In the cartoon, Millie is renamed Mattie.
A girl named Mattie, who turned a mole's paw into a keyring, is cursed by the three-legged animal, sending her burrowing underground to escape it.: Fate: Mattie becomes a mole and the Queen of england starts growing mole hair.
65	12	"Puppet on a String"	Puppet on a String	Terror Time Toys	Worms	11 April 2006	TBA
A willful would-be stage actor named Calloway Candlewick learns the folly of being uncooperative at home.: Fate: Calloway becomes a puppet of the puppet master so now he can.
66	13	"The Soul Stealer"	The Soul Stealer	Gruesome Grown Ups	Slugs	12 April 2006	TBA
A popular girl named Poppy uses the camera in her new mobile phone to blackmail kids in her school and family members, but the angry father of one of her victims warns her about harming others with photography. When she discovered herself in her photographs, the Soul Stealer literally stole her soul as punishment for her unfunny pranks.: Fate: Poppy is put in a photo of her mother and father on honeymoon by the Soul Stealer.

== Series 6 (2006) ==
No. overall	No. in series	Title	Story title	Book origin	Creatures in the Popcorn Bucket	Original release date	Changes
67	1	"Jamie's School Dinners"	Jamie's School Dinners	Gruesome Grown Ups	Slugs	20 September 2006	Jamie is too busy to visit his friend's house.
A boy named Jamie Jackson is exempted from his school's healthy eating policy and eats nothing but junk food given to him by the witch Ambrosine, who later turns him into chicken nuggets.: Fate: Jamie explodes after getting force fed by Ambrosine and is made into chicken nuggets.
68	2	"Recyclops"	Recyclops	Freaks of Nature	Flies	20 September 2006	TBA
A selfish and wasteful girl named Scabby who contributes nothing to the human race, learns a grim lesson in recycling when a large robot visits her house by using his teleporting abilities.: Fate: Scabby gets turned into a robot like machine by Recyclops.
69	3	"The Clothes Pigs"	The Clothes Pigs	Nasty Little Beasts	Beetles	21 September 2006	Truman's father tells him that enough is enough. In the book, he wishes that the Clothes Pigs would teach his son a lesson.
A slovenly boy named Truman "Truffle" Snuffle is paid a visit by some very hungry piglets.: Fate: Truman "Truffle" Snuffle is eaten alive by the clothes pigs.
70	4	"Why Boys Make Better Burglars"	Why Boys Make Better Burglars	Terror Time Toys	Worms	21 September 2006	TBA
A family of burglars are excited when a boy named Billy Burglar is born. Later, the parents teach their new daughter how to be a burglar just like them, while their son serves time in prison.: Fate: Billy is put in prison while his father and mother teach their daughter to be a shoplifter.
71	5	"The Watermelon Babies"	The Watermelon Babies	Blubbers and Sicksters	Slugs	16 October 2006	TBA
Two selfish sisters named Kitty and Winnie Camel, who are wasteful with water, are turned into watermelons to quench their dehydrated classmates' thirst.: Fate: Kitty and Winnie Camel are turned into watermelons and get a sticky end by getting eaten.
72	6	"eBoy"	eBoy	Terror Time Toys	Flies	17 October 2006	TBA
A computer addict named Eric is stripped of all his unnecessary body parts to live happily ever after in cyberspace, only for his luck to run out when the computer is attacked by a virus.: Fate: Eric is stripped into his brain, one eye and hands.
73	7	"Nobby's Nightmare"	Nobby's Nightmare	Gruesome Grown Ups	Beetles	18 October 2006	TBA
Driven mad by his nudist parents, a youngster named Nobby has trouble deciding what's real and what's not.: Fate: Nobby is eaten alive by his alien crush, Sophie.
74	8	"The Dumb Klutzes"	The Dumb Clucks	Fearsome Tales for Fiendish Kids	Beetles	19 October 2006	Title change. The main family is renamed the Klutzes instead of the Clucks; The con-man refers to his father as the "Almighty Wishbringer in the Sky" as opposed to God. Mr. Pojo is renamed Mr. Scoffman.
A cowboy-like con-man arrives at a town whose residents named the Klutzes believe everything they are told, and promises them untold gifts, for doing tasks that end up with all the villagers (save for the only sensible person Mr. Skoffman) being inescapably eaten by his cyclops-like father.: Fate: all the villagers except Mr Skoffman are eaten by the Almighty Wishbringer-in-the-Sky.
75	9	"The Lobster's Scream"	The Lobster's Scream	Nasty Little Beasts	Slugs	20 October 2006	TBA
A selfish girl named Shannon Shellfish whose desire to own a lobster suit lands her in hot water — in more ways than one.: Fate: Shannon is boiled alive in a pot of boiling water by lobsters.
76	10	"The Old Tailor of Pelting Moor"	The Old Tailor of Pelting Moor	Gruesome Grown Ups	Flies	18 October 2006	In the book, Jumbo speaks with a mock French accent, indicating that he might be from Paris, France. In the cartoon, he speaks in a British accent because not all accents are easy.
A vain fashion victim named Jumbo Ferrari hears of a new suit and wants to buy it but is in for a nasty surprise.: Fate: Jumbo Ferrari's skin is swapped for the old tailors skin.
77	11	"Big Head"	Big Head	The "Me!" Monsters	Beetles	18 October 2006	TBA
A football mascot named Samuel "Sammy" Slitherall is overly smug about being picked for the job. As a result, he steals his father's money and credit card to buy the finer things in life. When he started thinking that he was a celebrity, a medicine practitioner named Dr. Chu rids his delusions of grandeur with a special face wrap, which made Sammy's head shrink to the size of a honeybee.: Fate: Dr Chu shrinks Samuel "Sammy" Slitherall's head to the size of a honeybee.
78	12	"The Piranha Sisters"	The Piranha Sisters	Blubbers and Sicksters	Beetles	19 October 2006	TBA
An older girl named Dorothy May Piranha whose pranks lead to her naive little sister P.T. getting suspended from school, but Dorothy May is not finished yet. When a ghost-like skeleton warns her about not stopping her humourless jokes, she's turned into a skeleton when a group of hungry piranhas decides to teach her a lesson.: Fate: Dorothy May is eaten by Piranhas till nothing but her skeleton remains.
79	13	"Tom Time"	Tom Time	Freaks of Nature	Slugs	19 October 2006	TBA
A boy named Tom whose lack of punctuality is put to the test when the world is due to end the next day. He survives, but 1 hour later, his luck runs out as does his time.: Fate: Tom explodes one hour later.

== Series 7 (2011) ==
All 13 episodes were produced in 2010.

No. overall	No. in series	Title	Story title	Book origin	Changes	Original release date
80	1	"Tinklebell"	Tinkerbell	The Gnaughty Gnomes of "NO!"	The title is changed.	2 May 2011
Gilbert Sparrow is a fussy eating boy who is given a grim lesson by a mysterious fellow.: Fate: Gilbert Sparrow is eaten alive by his own parents
81	2	"Sick to Death"	Sick to Death	The Gnaughty Gnomes of "NO!"	At the original story Mr. Spew left the house to never return and Mrs. Spew runs away with the vacuum salesman	2 May 2011
In the early 1950s, Victoria Spew is an evil girl who constantly vomits to get what she wants but meets her match in a magic vacuum cleaner.: Fate: Victoria Spew is sucked into the shark deluxe organs and all
82	3	"The Ugly Prince"	The Ugly Prince	The "Me!" Monsters	TBA	3 May 2011
Prince Spencer is a spoilt, tantrum-prone boy who is turned ugly for crossing his fairy godmother.: Fate: Prince Spencer is run over by a lawn mower blended in a blender and forced to be drunk by the gardener
83	4	"Hear No Weevil See No Weevil"	Hear No Weevil See No Weevil	Freaks of Nature	TBA	3 May 2011
Broccoli Brassica is a girl who is obsessed with size but is visited by mysterious insects.: Fate: Broccoli Brassica is sucked dry by Weevils till nothing but her skin remains
84	5	"The Rise and Fall of the Evil Guff"	The Rise and Fall of the Evil Guff	Superzeroes	TBA	4 May 2011
Bart Thumper is a boy who uses his stinky farts as weapons to get his way but meets his end in a medieval manure pile.: Fate: Bart thumper is ever so slowly from 1261 to 1263 composted to death
85	6	"Cat's Eyes"	Cat's Eyes	Blubbers and Sicksters	Cat has 7 siblings in the book. In the episode, she has 4.	4 May 2011
Cat Clore is a mean older girl who tries to coerce her siblings into doing her wishes but meets a gruesome end.: Fate: Cat Clore is run over by a steamroller
86	7	"Message in a Bottle"	Message in a Bottle	The Gnaughty Gnomes of "NO!"	TBA	5 May 2011
Popering Partridge is a boy who hates his father's job, but soon finds himself in a sticky situation.: Fate: Popering Partridge is put in a bottle by Poor William
87	8	"Little Angel"	Little Angel	Superzeroes	TBA	5 May 2011
Eliza Toadley is a dishonest girl who cheats in games, and pins the blame on her brother Wycombe, but is turned into a stone statue by a gargoyle.: Fate: Eliza Toadley is turned into a stone statue by a gargoyle
88	9	"The Dragon Moth"	The Dragon Moth	The Gnaughty Gnomes of "NO!"	TBA	6 May 2011
Josiah Reeks is a disobedient Cornish boy who never obeys signs but is tricked into paying a visit to a giant monster at a lighthouse.: Fate: Josiah Reeks is dropped onto the rocks by the Dragon Moth
89	10	"The Long Face"	The Long Face	The Gnaughty Gnomes of "NO!"	The decapitation scene is cut due to it being graphic.	6 May 2011
The Headless Horseman pays a visit to Petty Gambrel-Fetlock, a moody and jealous little girl who is constantly sulking to get her way and have what her rival Jill has got.: Fate: the headless horseman with the head the groomer stuart piddle forges a horse muzzle on to Petty
90	11	"Kingdom of Wax"	The Kingdom of Wax	The "Me!" Monsters	The boy of the story's name is changed from Nebuchadnezzar to Nathaniel and a lot of religious references (as well as Nebuchadnezzar's sister Ruth) were cut out of the cartoon episode.	9 May 2011
Nathaniel Luminaire is a boy with a desperation to attract girls (especially Purnellopy, Jill, Broccoli, Petty and Eliza) which brings him to an early grave.: Fate: Nathaniel Luminaire is burned alive in the Kingdom of wax due to his hair spray
91	12	"The Spelling Bee"	The Death Rattle	Terror Time Toys	The title is changed and Anthony Foley is renamed Tuba Colleen in the episode.	9 May 2011
Purnellopy Underblanket is an obstinate young girl who thinks she is a marvellous speller but attracts a swarm of killer bees that turn her into a humanoid beehive.: Fate: Purnellopy becomes a humanoid beehive.
92	13	"The Flat Pack Kid"	The Flat Pack Kid	Superzeroes	TBA	10 May 2011
Humpty Egg is a boy who constantly takes things apart (and never puts them back together) and is reduced to a pile of components.: Fate: Humpty Egg is taken apart by DIY dye and reduced to his components, but as the night porter mentions, he was put in the games room as a jigsaw puzzle, and some of his parts have gone missing.

== Series 8 (2011–2012) ==
Despite the episodes being aired in 2011 and 2012, all 13 episodes were produced in 2010.

No. overall	No. in series	Title	Story title	Book origin	Changes	Original release date
93	1	"The Blood Doctor"	The Blood Doctor	The "Me!" Monsters	TBA	5 September 2011
Georgina "George" Sutcliffe is a beauty queen who is obsessed with winning. When she shares bad blood with some of the other beauty queens, she is visited by an unusual doctor.: Fate: Georgina is turned into a pickled walnut by the blood doctor
94	2	"The Hair Fairies"	The Hair Fairies	Blubbers and Sicksters	His name was Hemp Sock, and his sister Moonunit was named Moonbuggy. In the episode, he's named Peacebiscuit.	6 September 2011
Peacebiscuit Van Perm is a boy whose jealousy over his sister’s hair lands him in trouble with mysterious fairies.: Fate: Peacebiscuit is petrified into wood by the hair fairies
95	3	"The Apostrophic Expositor"	The Apostrophic Expositor	The "Me!" Monsters	B.S Brogan was in the story as a boy, but he's changed to a girl in the episode.	7 September 2011
B.S. Brogan is a chatterbox who learns a grim lesson in speech when she's visited by a mysterious man.: Fate: B.S Brogan becomes a . (full stop) due to the apostrophic expositor
96	4	"Nerves of Steel"	Fatal Attraction	Superzeroes	The title is changed. Charlie has four sisters named Cheryl, Charlotte, Chipolata and Chips in the book. In the episode, he has three.	8 September 2011
Charlie Chicken is a pathological liar who is made attractive to metal.: Fate: Charlie Chicken drowns after the ships that were sunk are attracted to him
97	5	"The Worm"	The Worm	Superzeroes	TBA	9 September 2011
Eustace Colon, a boy who uses worms to torment his sister Evie, meets a gruesome end after he ingests a tapeworm, causing him to turn into a worm which makes him an easy meal for birds.: Fate: Eustace Colon is eaten alive by 420 black birds aka crows
98	6	"Lazy Bones"	Lazybones	The Gnaughty Gnomes of "NO!"	TBA	10 September 2011
Ida Lydon is a lazy girl who is literally stripped of her bones by the Boneshaker.: Fate: Ida lydon's bones are removed by the bone shaker she becomes a balloon but then she pops due to the razor quilled porcupine the night night porter got her as a pet
99	7	"Frank Einstein's Monster"	Frank Einstein's Monster	Freaks of Nature	In the book, Frank was put on a bonfire. In the episode, he's saved and promises himself not to play with fireworks again.	29 October 2012
Frank Einstein is a pyromaniacal boy who enters a competition in order to be able to have as much fun with fire as he likes. But his new creation quickly turns against him and decides to teach him a lesson.: Fate: Frank Einstein nearly gets launched on the firework but someone saved him frank promised not to play with fire again, but as the Night Night Porter mentions that the monster got away and he's out there now, waiting to scare the pants of other wicked children. "Have you checked your garden shed recently?"
100	8	"Nails in Her Coffin"	Nails in Her Coffin	Wonder Freaks	Grizelda's last name isn't mentioned in the cartoon.	29 October 2012
Grizelda Grimm is a cruel girl who adopts a cat-like personality, but soon meets the same end as her deceased cat.: Fate: Grizelda grim drowns in next doors swimming pool just like her pet cat slasher and her nails keep growing even after death
101	9	"The Undertaker"	The Undertaker	Wonder Freaks	N/A	30 October 2012
Gulab Gobby, a boy who constantly talks, loses his body and eventually his voice after he catches a cold.: Fate: Gulab Gobby becomes invisible and as mentioned by the Night Night Porter died of a cold
102	10	"The Little Flower Girl"	The Little Flower Girl	Superzeroes	Petal's head was chopped off in the book, but she's transformed into a flower in the episode.	30 October 2012
Petal Stalewater, a girl who steals flowers to make people admire her, is literally turned into a flower after taking the Black Angel away and mistrusting a little flower-like robot.: Fate: Petal Stalewater becomes a black angel flower after pulling the last black angel flower
103	11	"The Wrap Man"	N/A	Wonder Freaks	Carlton's last name isn't mentioned in the cartoon.	31 October 2012
Carlton Belcher, a boy who never sends thank-you letters, is shipped to his great-aunt Wilma by the Wrap Man to thank her personally.: Fate: Carlton Belcher is posted by the wrap man to his auntie Wilma getting every bone in his body broken in the process
104	12	"Old McDonald's Farm"	Old McDonald's Farm	Wonder Freaks	N/A	1 November 2012
Angela Asbrew, a girl with ABSOLUTELY no respect for old people, is dispatched after being turned into a chicken.: Fate: Angela asbrew is killed by old Mac Donald the farmer her cries of pain as the night night porter mentions were eegh ohhh eegh iiiii ohhh
105	13	"The Nuclear Wart"	The Nuclear Wart	Blubbers and Sicksters	The brothers were named Jim and Terry in the cartoon instead of Tom and Jerry, most likely due to the American cartoon of the same name.	2 November 2012
The Ganglion brothers, Jim and Terry, cause the world to be destroyed when the negative energy of their constant fighting manifests as a wart. As a result, the wart uses its roots to put good energy into the citizens of every town in the world.: Fate: Jim and Terry and everyone on earth die after the wart sucks the Earth's core dry
