= Grizzly Tales for Gruesome Kids (TV series) =

Animated television series based on a book series by Jamie Rix

- Genre: Comedy
- Based on: Grizzly Tales for Gruesome Kids by Jamie Rix
- Written by: Jamie Rix
- Directed by: Jamie Rix; Sara and Simon Bor
- Narrated by: Nigel Planer
- Composer: Ed Welch
- Country of origin: United Kingdom
- Original language: English
- No. of series: 6 (Grizzly Tales for Gruesome Kids); 2 (Grizzly Tales)
- No. of episodes: 78 (+ 1 22-minute special) (Note: For Grizzly Tales for Gruesome Kids); 26 (Note: For Grizzly Tales: Cautionary Tales for Lovers of Squeam!) (list of episodes)

Production
- Executive producers: Michael Forte (series 1–3); Rachel Pendleton (series 2); David Mercer (series 4)
- Producers: Clive Hedges (series 1–2); Sarah Muller (series 3–4); Simon Bor and Sara Bor
- Production locations: Devon (Honeycomb Animation), Isle of Man (Lough House), Ealing Studios
- Animators: Honeycomb Animation, Ealing Studios
- Editors: Peter Beswick; Nick Anderson; Keezer Tracy; Jon Ellis; Simon Brook; Nick Griffiths; David Frisby; Steve Brown; Andy Wood
- Running time: 10 minutes
- Production companies: Honeycomb Animation; Elephant Productions (Note: Later known as Grizzly TV for series 5 & 6 and the revival series.); Carlton Television (seasons 1–4)

Original release
- Network: ITV (series 1–6); Nicktoons (series 7–8)
- Release: 4 January 2000 – 2 November 2012

Related
- Grizzly Tales: Cautionary Tales for Lovers of Squeam!

Grizzly Tales for Gruesome Kids is a British animated comedy television series based on the children's book series by Jamie Rix. After the first three books were published from 1990 to 1996, Carlton Television adapted the short stories into ten-minute cartoons for ITV, produced by themselves, Honeycomb Animation, and Rix's production company, Elephant Productions. It aired on CITV between January 2000 and October 2006 with six series and 78 episodes, as well as a New Year's Eve special that was over 20 minutes longer than other episodes. The series returned in a new format for Nicktoons with 26 episodes split into two series under the name Grizzly Tales (also known as Grizzly Tales: Cautionary Tales for Lovers of Squeam!), which aired between May 2011 and November 2012.

Both versions of the series have been nominated for BAFTAs and the CITV series has received numerous international awards from animated film festivals. Both have been popular on their respective channels; the CITV series has often been re-aired on Nickelodeon with the Nicktoons series.

== History and development ==
In 1993, Honeycomb Animation founders Simon and Sara Bor had signed a deal with Central (later owned by Carlton Television) to create the cartoon Wolves, Witches and Giants. According to Simon, the then-head of Carlton Television, Michael Forte, had initially been hesitant to develop the project until Carlton took over Central, but he handed them a copy of Grizzly Tales for Gruesome Kids and advised them to "Get in touch with the author, and see if you can come up with something." Years before, after the success of his debut book Grizzly Tales for Gruesome Kids, Rix had attempted to use his producer credits to get his work adapted by sending copies to television studios. When Honeycomb and Elephant agreed on a partnership, Rix's producer partner Nigel Planer was performing a few of the Grizzly, Ghostly, and Fearsome short stories during the evenings on BBC Radio 5 (which re-aired on Radio 4), but pre-production was forcibly halted just as storyboarding began due to studio hesitations over the source material and the publisher of Fearsome Tales for Fiendish Kids (Hodder Children's Books) being different from the rest in the trilogy (André Deutsch Limited).

After Wolves, Witches and Giants concluded in 1998, Forte funded a three-minute television pilot based on Grizzly Tales book series. He intended to send it to Greece for Cartoon Forum, but they were unprepared so he sent it to ITV. Nigel Pickard had been the controller for CITV for a year and greenlit the series immediately, with a budget between US$2 million (Note: £1,415,529.58 in 1998) (equivalent to £2,747,593 in 2025) and $3.3 million (Note: £2,275,703.40 in 1998) (equivalent to £4,417,223 in 2025) for 26 episodes, later explaining: "We [CITV] had commissioned a lot of cuddly preschool shows and needed something to act as a bridge between the older and younger stuff in the schedule." In September, it was pitched to Cartoon Forum, which was attended by numerous children's television broadcaster representatives, who unanimously approved and offered a percentage of the budget. Thirteen episodes were created within 15 months for the first series with Rix as co-director and co-screenwriter, Nigel Planer as narrator, and the Bors as directors, with animation divided between Honeycomb, and Elephant Productions' sister company Lough House. Carlton International joined with other British broadcasters to promote and sell the series along with other programmes and films as a combined package for MIPCOM's Media Market and Cape Town's Sithengi Film Festival in November and December 1999 respectively. The first episode — "The New Nanny" — aired on CITV afternoon terrestrial slot at 4 pm on 4 January 2000, followed by twelve episodes that aired weekly until 27 March. To promote the new cartoon, Rix rereleased the first three books with Hodder and Scholastic Ltd., as well as the new More Grizzly Tales for Gruesome Kids, with front covers designed by Honeycomb Animation.

== Grizzly Tales for Gruesome Kids (2000–2006) ==
Each episode has a framing device of an old movie theatre named the Squeam Screen, which is solely occupied by its creepy caretaker and his spider companion, Spindleshanks. The adapted stories are short movies on film reels that the caretaker screens from the projector into the theatre, after he finishes talking to the audience about morals and proverbs that will later relate to the story of that episode (sometimes as he bullies Spindleshanks through malicious pranks and cowardice). These were an invention from Planer, who suggested that the adapted stories should have consistency. These scenes are animated with Claymation, whereas the adapted stories from the books were traditionally animated, then later animated in Adobe Flash.

Top, L-R: Algie and Ginger in "The Chipper Chums Go Scrumping" Bottom, L-R: Milo and Ginger Pie in "Knock Down Ginger".

Episodes are faithful to the original story, however, there are some minor changes. For example, the Cluck family in the eponymous story "The Dumb Clucks" were renamed the Klutz family, and the title was expectantly adjusted. Other notable changes included the use of character models that were constantly reused in many episodes either with minor adjustments or not, alternating between main and background characters: the character model for Dorothy May Piranha from "The Piranha Sisters" is the same "actress" who was Savannah Slumberson in "The Grub-A-Blub Blub". However, the set character appearances occasionally led to an appearance deviation from how the character was described in the original story: the bullying Ginger Pie in "Knock Down Ginger" was described as a tall, overweight boy with pale skin and pale red hair, but his character model – the same one used for Ginger (no relation) in "The Chipper Chums Go Scrumping" (who was a boy implied to be very outdoorsy with his friends) – was a skinny boy with curly red hair. Loralilee's witch doctor cure in "Doctor Moribundus" was adapted out of the cartoon, replaced with the Squeam Screen caretaker's narration claiming that the cure was too disturbing to tell as the viewer is shown the outside her bedroom window, and Stinker's murder in "The Chipper Chums Goes Scrumping" is changed to becoming crippled.

The original four books in the series were adapted for the first four series (although some, such as "The Matchstick Girl", were never adapted) but the final two series featured new stories that would later appear in the Grizzly Tales: Cautionary Tales for Lovers of Squeam! books. The theme music was altered at this time with a completely different melody and a faster tempo than the one used at the beginning of the cartoon's run. The framing device with the caretaker and Spindleshanks disappeared and the end of the opening titles would cut to the projector being turned on. Like the first two series, series five and six were commissioned in bulk as a 26-episode deal.

In 2007, it was announced that ITV was planning to promote ITV4 more frequently, which led to numerous ITV programming being cancelled; Digital Spy and Broadcast revealed that Grizzly Tales for Gruesome Kids had not been offered a seventh series — despite its popularity — finishing in 2006. Michael Grade, the ITV chairman, explained that it did not make "commercial sense" to generously invest in a children's channel.

== Grizzly Tales (2011–2012) ==
The series was getting some reruns on Nickelodeon at the same time as Honeycomb Animation announced that a new season of the series would be aired on Nicktoons UK in May. This new programme would have a shortened, catchier name and be "reinvented for a modern audience with even more twisted, dark stories to delight children everywhere" but would remain to a formula similar to the newer book series, Grizzly Tales: Cautionary Tales for Lovers of Squeam!.

Other differences would be the location of the framing device, which was now at The Hot-Hell Darkness instead of the Squeam Screen movie theatre and the animation: the hotel scenes were 3D animated and the stories were animated in 2D software. The cinema caretaker was now replaced by the re-invented books' The Night-Night Porter, his half-brother, who banishes horrible children to spend an eternity at his hotel. Nigel Planer, Elephant Productions (now named Little Brother Productions) and the crew returned for this series, and the show, although for a new generation, was as popular and successful as its predecessor.

== Characters ==
This is a list of the cast that frequently appears in the two television adaptations.

- Uncle Grizzly: He is the only character who speaks in the CITV series and is voiced by Nigel Planer. He gives the audience morals, proverbs and examples of life lessons, as well as narrating the short movies. In the opening titles, he appears at the end of the sequence, walking up to the projection room to blow out his electric torch and grab a film reel out of a towering stack as he says, "You are welcome to Grizzly Tales for Gruesome Kids, a series of cautionary tales for lovers of squeam!" Not much is known about him from the series outside of being a surrogate mentor; however, he is prone to shapeshift his head into a variety of things to terrify the audience or Spindleshanks. Outside of the series, his character profile is available to view on the official Grizzly Tales website, which reveals that his favorite movie he has shown is first series' third episode, "Grandmother's Footsteps".
- Spindleshanks: A large purple spider that lives in The Squeam Screen movie theatre. He communicates non-verbally (through facial expressions) but occasionally squeaks or speaks. Uncle Grizzly constantly uses him for audience demonstrations, but often as an excuse to bully, torture and abuse him for laughs. One ending to an episode showed that he had become a ghost, which made Uncle Grizzly cackle. He is said to have an aunt who lives in Australia. He does not appear in the Nickelodeon series.
- The Night Night Porter: The official narrator of the second book series, half-brother of Uncle Grizzly, and the owner of the Hot Hell Darkness hotel; also voiced by Nigel Planer. He is similar to his movie theatre caretaker relative through being a mentor to the reader/audience, being the only other character in the television adaptations that speaks. He relishes in punishing children, particularly horrible ones, and shows off some of the tortures that his guests are receiving in their rooms.

== Crew ==
Forte was executive producer for three series of the CITV programme and was succeeded by David Mercer. Other producers included Clive Hedges (first two series) and Sarah Muller (three and four). The stop-motion was animated by Andy Farago, Richard Randolph and Nick Herbert (Ealing Animation) and the 2D animation was animated by numerous animators, including Gareth Conway, Graham Hayter, Chris Bowles, Sam Wooldridge, Oli Knowles, Dan Mitchell, Casey Fulton, Trev Phillips, Malcolm Yeates, Jon Miller, Daniel Mitchell, Victoria Goy-Smith, Liam Williamson, Francis Iowe, Karen Elliott, Craig Hindmarsh and Steven Buckler.

In 2004, Grizzly TV was created: a sister company to represent the partnership between Honeycomb and Elephant/Little Brother.

== Broadcast ==
For the CITV series:

- United Kingdom: ITV's CITV block, CITV channel, Nicktoons and Nickelodeon.
- France: TF1
- Germany: RTV (formerly Ravensburger)
- Canada: YTV
- Croatia
- Australia: ABC Kids
- Spain
- Sweden: SVT1
- Portugal
- Italy: Rai 3
- Denmark
- Norway
- Ireland: RTÉ
- Finland: YLE TV2
- Latin America: Discovery Kids
- Serbia: Happy TV, Pink Super Kids, Pink 2
- Hong Kong: TVB Pearl

For the Nickelodeon series:

- United Kingdom and Ireland: Nicktoons
- Australia: ABC 3

== Merchandise ==
The CITV cartoon was available for purchase on DVD in the UK, as well as PorchLight Home Entertainment in North America and Time Life's Shock Records in Australia and New Zealand. The Nickelodeon cartoon was later released on DVD through the same respective companies, however, it was released in the UK and Northern Ireland with Abbey Home Media.

Type	Title	Format	Date	Run time	Region	Distributor	ID	ID 2	Ref
VHS	Grizzly Tales for Gruesome Kids - The Spaghetti Man	PAL	19 March 2001	61 minutes	—N/a	Carlton Video	ASIN B00004R814		
VHS	Grizzly Tales for Gruesome Kids - The Barber of Civil	PAL	19 March 2001	61 minutes	—N/a	Carlton Video	ASIN B000058CB1		
DVD	Grizzly Tales: Monty's Python And Other Tales	PAL	10 April 2006	80 minutes	Region 2	ITV Studios	ASIN B000EGCDCS		
DVD	Grizzly Tales: Doctor Moribundus	NTSC	2008	66 minutes	Region 1	PorchLight Home Entertainment	OCLC 212415103	OCLC 879503903	
DVD	Grizzly Tales: A Tangled Web	NTSC	2008	77 minutes	Region 1	PorchLight Home Entertainment	OCLC 212415105		
DVD	Grizzly Tales for Gruesome Kids: Series 1 & 2	PAL	2008	260 minutes	Region 4	Shock Entertainment	OCLC 225588276		
DVD	Grizzly Tales for Gruesome Kids: Series 3 & 4	PAL	2008	260 minutes	Region 4	Shock Entertainment	OCLC 225588306		
DVD	Grizzly Tales for Gruesome Kids: Series 5 & 6	PAL	2008	412 minutes	Region 4	Shock Entertainment	OCLC 271311220		
DVD	Grizzly Tales for Gruesome Kids: The Complete Series	PAL	2008	—N/a	Region 4	Shock Entertainment	ASIN B0036WQK58		
DVD	Grizzly Tales for Gruesome Kids: Hear No Weevil, See No Weevil	PAL	4 January 2012	145 minutes	Region 0	Shock Entertainment		OCLC 886608821	
DVD	Grizzly Tales for Gruesome Kids: Frank Einstein's Monster	PAL	4 January 2012	—N/a	Region 0	Shock Entertainment	ASIN B07N14ZCL7	OCLC 777274274	
DVD	Grizzly Tales for Gruesome Kids: The Nuclear Wart	PAL	30 September 2013	121 minutes	Region 2	Abbey Home Media	ASIN B00CX3AIRC		
DVD	Grizzly Tales for Gruesome Kids: Seasons 1-4	PAL	16 October 2024	520 minutes	Region 4	Via Vision Entertainment			

== Episodes ==
Grizzly Tales for Gruesome Kids
Series	Episodes	Originally released		
Series	Episodes	First released	Last released	Network
1	13	4 January 2000	27 March 2000	CITV
2	13	9 April 2001	27 April 2001	CITV
3	12	10 December 2002	4 March 2003	CITV
4	14	2 April 2004	21 May 2004	CITV
"The Crystal Eye"		31 December 2004		CITV
5	13	27 March 2006	12 April 2006	CITV
6	13	20 September 2006	20 October 2006	CITV

Grizzly Tales: Cautionary Tales for Lovers of Squeam!
Series	Episodes	Originally released		
Series	Episodes	First released	Last released	Network
1	13	2 May 2011	10 May 2011	NickToons UK
2	13	5 September 2011	2 November 2012	NickToons UK

== Awards and nominations ==
=== CITV series ===
Year	Award	Category	Nominee	Result	Ref
2000	Golden Gate Awards	Silver Spire Award for Best Children's Program		1st place	
2000	Cartoons on the Bay	The Pulcinella Award for Best Series for Children		Won	
2000	Prix Jeunesse	Fiction 6 – 11		2nd	
2000	International Animation and Cartoons Festival	Best Short Film		2nd	
2000	Bradford Animation Festival	Best TV Series for Children		Won	
2000	RTS Devon & Cornwall Centre Awards	Best Network Programme		Won	
2000	Royal Television Society Programme Awards	Best Children's Entertainment Programme		Nominated	
2001	New York Festivals: TV Programming and Promotion	Children's Programs		Gold World Medal	
2001	Golden Sheaf Awards	Best International Children's Production		Won	
2004	British Animation Awards	Best Children's Series	"Revenge of the Bogeyman"	Won	
2004	British Animation Awards	Children's Choice Award	"Revenge of the Bogeyman"	Won	
2004	British Academy Children's Awards	Animation		Nominated	
2004	British Academy Children's Awards	Most Original Writer	Jamie Rix	Nominated	
2005	British Academy Children's Awards	Animation		Nominated	
2005	British Academy Children's Awards	Most Original Writer	Jamie Rix	Nominated	
2006	British Academy Children's Awards	Best Writer	Jamie Rix	Nominated	
2006	Broadcast Awards	Best Children's Programme		Nominated	

=== Nickelodeon series ===
Year	Award	Category	Result	Ref
2012	BAFTA	Best Children's Series	Nominated	
2012	Broadcast Awards	Best Children's Series	Won	

== See also ==
- Goosebumps
- Tales from the Crypt
- Freaky Stories
