= More Grizzly Tales for Gruesome Kids =

Book full of short stories by Jamie Rix

- First edition
- Author: Jamie Rix
- Audio read by: Bill Wallis
- Cover artist: Honeycomb Animation
- Language: English
- Series: Grizzly Tales for Gruesome Kids
- Release number: 4
- Genre: Children's horror
- Publisher: Scholastic UK (Hippo)
- Publication date: 19 January 2001
- Publication place: United Kingdom
- Media type: Print (Paperback)
- Pages: 304
- ISBN: 9780439998185
- OCLC: 45853994
- Preceded by: Fearsome Tales for Fiendish Kids
- Followed by: Nasty Little Beasts

More Grizzly Tales for Gruesome Kids is a 2001 children's horror short-story collection from Scholastic UK by British author Jamie Rix and is the fourth book in the Grizzly Tales for Gruesome Kids book series. It was the first book to be written after the Grizzly Tales for Gruesome Kids cartoon adaptation by ITV, which aired on CITV. It was also the last book in the original book series before it was retooled in 2007 as Grizzly Tales: Cautionary Tales for Lovers of Squeam!, and is the book with the most stories at twenty, whereas the first and second had fifteen, the third had sixteen, and the rest that would later follow had six.

== Synopsis ==
=== Knock Down Ginger ===
Entomologist Mr Thrips is a pariah in the town of Nimby. He lives in one of the richest private streets (described as a "millionaire's row") next to people who drive Mercedes-Benz, Jeep and Jaguar cars, sharing a home full of several insect species which made his house look unkempt and creepy. Residents despise him for allowing the street to look uneven and nicknamed the house "Bug City Central", so his neighbours, the Pie family, become determined to get rid of him. At a council meeting, Amelia Pie terrifies the audience with her fears of Thrips' behaviour giving Nimby a bad reputation, which is heightened when Colonel Dithering claims that termites can eat houses. As the audience panics over their eaten houses disallowing them to park their cars and have cocktail parties, Amelia boasts her son will be the person to successfully scare Thrips out of town.

Ginger Pie and his friend "Mad" Milo have already been bullying Thrips through vandalising his front garden and writing/yelling insults through his letter box. Milo's lisping sister Liza does not understand why the two boys relish in targeting an innocent old man but she is usually ignored, and Milo spitefully reveals Liza's nickname "Lizzie the Lizard" through reverse psychology. Ginger echoes the town's sentiments and calls Thrips ugly, claiming he shares many resemblances to the insects he shares his house with, to which Liza points out Ginger's pale skin and pale, red hair, and says "you look like Dracula just drank your blood." Ginger spots Thrips gardening and crosses the road to call him an "insect maniac", but he is terrified when Thrips scolds him in a tranquil fury without turning around to look at him. Milo later suggests Thrips has literal eyes in the back of his head but Ginger adamantly replies that Thrips might be an insect humanoid who they need to chase out their town. Luckily, his mother already endorses the idea so he and Milo decide to make Thrips' stay uncomfortable by playing Knock Down Ginger. The boys calculate the length of time it takes for Thrips to get out of his armchair to answer the front door as ten minutes, and play Knock Down Ginger all day. Then Ginger jumps over the fence into the back garden to destroy Thrips' giant termite mounds but stops when he feels vibrations from the mud. Suddenly, Thrips appears in the kitchen and Ginger rushes back to the front door to take his turn at the doorbell. The door shoots open and Thrips drags Ginger inside.

Thrips threatens he will retaliate just as horribly if Ginger refuses to stop with his pranks but Ginger is distracted: insects pattern the walls and fly around the room, and he can feel some land all over his body. He agrees to stop and hears the humming vibrations that he heard from the termite mounds. He opens an opposite door to find a levitating chair, assuming that he had walked in on a magic trick but Thrips explains that his termites are eating the wood inside so fast that it is creating a hovering illusion. He snaps his fingers and the chair disintegrates onto the floor. When Ginger leaves, he warns Milo and Liza that Thrips is not impressed with their behaviour but Milo scoffs at Ginger's sudden reluctance, accusing him and Liza of overreacting as he stomps to the door. Ginger pushes him and his sister out of the way and presses the doorbell. 30 minutes later, despite ringing the bell continuously, there was still no response and a bored Ginger walked home. He checks his pockets for the house keys and presses the doorbell, which makes the ground gradually shake to the sound of high whistling. By the time Ginger realised what was happening, Thrips' termites had eaten through his shoes and the rest of his body. Amelia opens the door to see a wide-eyed, statue-like Ginger, who disintegrates into sawdust when she touches him. She slams the front door to grab a telephone and the house collapses around her. On the other side of the road, Thrips' termites sleep peacefully after their enormous dinner.

=== The Upset Stomach ===
Ethel Turnip enjoys eating to the point of it being a hobby. She notices an article in the newspaper about a Yorkshire farm that breeds animal stomachs and demands her parents get her one for a Christmas present as she stands on the kitchen table. When her parents hesitate, Ethel promises to look after it like a pet and she will use it a "second stomach" for herself; she will even call it "Rover". A smelly, gurgling parcel arrives two weeks later with a stomach as big as a basketball, spraying stomach acid that landed on the tablecloth, making it dissolve smokily. Although Ethel regrets the decision, she is grateful that it does as she wants at the Christmas dinner, but Rover the stomach becomes a needy nuisance that always followed her around the house and woke her up at night, and whenever she took the stomach out for a walk, children would cackle until their clothes fell apart. After deliberately leaving the stomach in a kennel overnight, Ethel is forced to take the stomach out to walk again to warm it up (only because her father threatened to never serve her oven chips otherwise), so she attempts to abandon it in a park. Unfortunately for her, a policeman returns the stomach home.

Furious, Ethel wakes up early the next morning and stuffs Rover into six plastic bags. She travels to the countryside by bus to throw Rover into a cow herd, telling her parents that Rover died when she returns home. Rover goes on a vengeful rampage and eats everything in the countryside, and continues eating until it arrives home. Rover grows until the Prime Minister sends the British Army out with tanks but the stomach acid melts them, and is dubbed "The Killer Stomach" on the six o'clock news. The Turnip family meet the giant stomach outside their house and Ethel orders Rover to leave, but the stomach ignores her. Mr Turnip notices the rumbling and goes inside to get indigestion tablets, returning to find Rover rolling away and his daughter missing. Violent bubbling is heard and the stomach explodes across the street, and an undigested Ethel is launched through her bedroom window. She would never be greedy again, mostly because she stopped enjoying food: floating in Rover's insides damaged her sense of smell, making everything she ever eats taste offal.

=== The Gas Man Cometh ===
The first noise Stefan Krott ever heard in his life was the delivery room's telephone, starting an obsession with telephones. His parents bought him a toy telephone, but he took the cordless phone to play with, annoying his parents and the people he dialed. To this day, his favorite phone calls are prank calls and frequently does them to emergency services, once alerting the police to a bugler and the RSPCA to a pelican crossing the road. When his parents remove his access to telephones, he buys a mobile and continued, pretending to be Michael Caine to dinner ladies and telling a school janitor that an escaped horse is in the gymnasium.

At nine-years-old, Mr. Stinky calls his mobile, so Krott uses his hygiene comedy routine on him until Stinky hangs up, but during another prank call much later, a voice briefly intersects the call and threatens, "Stefan, we've got your number." He finishes his prank call and hangs up, but the phone rings immediately. It is the threatening voice, calling themselves "The Gas Man", offering to sell him helium that can change voices when inhaled. Krott accepts the offer, excited to finally cheat his way into impersonating the Queen, and skips school the next day to wait for the delivery after his parents went to work. At 12:10pm, two men in suits and sunglasses arrive with a man dressed in a boilersuit and baseball cap holding a gas cylinder—the Gas Man with his two bodyguards. Krott offers to pay but the Gas Man gives the gas cylinder to him for free, and leads the bodyguards out of the house.

Krott reads the instructions thoroughly and rushes to the phone, using the helium every few minutes and speaking whenever the high-pitched vocals began. Every person he called is completely fooled and he ached from suppressing laughter. When he finishes telling a man that he will be sent to the Tower, Krott realises he has floated into space and grabs onto a satellite. His phone rings and the caller snaps, "Game over! You lose!" The phone deactivates.

=== The Urban Fox ===
One morning, Lord and Lady Blunderbuss move into a busy council estate with their six horses and many beagles. The next day, they invite themselves inside the house of Mr and Mrs Smith, offering to befriend them. Although they are surprised that the elderly couple have no servants nor know any nearby bear-baiting clubs, it seems to be an ulterior motive to spy around the house, and they discover Mr and Mrs Smith's daughter, Parker, and her pet fox eating breakfast in the kitchen. The Blunderbuss couple declare that they will get rid of the fox for their neighbours (despite Parker and her parents protesting that their fox, Elvis, is an honorary family member) because a civilised society has no place for foxes. 30 minutes later, a bugle blares outside and the Smith family discover that the Blunderbuss couple had assembled their fox hunting team. Parker tells her parents not to panic and Elvis prepares to outwit his enemy.

The horses and beagles jump over the back garden fences as if they were hurdles as Elvis takes turns in different gardens disguising himself as garden ornaments, such as a bird bath, a satellite dish, a sunbather, a fishing gnome, and a croquet hoop. It tires the hunt to the point of Lord and Lady Blunderbuss agreeing that life in the city is not to their liking, so they gather their exhausted army with their belongings and move out. A street party is thrown in Elvis' honour where the neighbours express their gratitude to the Urban Fox. Meanwhile, the Blunderbuss couple have fled to Scotland to escape from the police, who pens them a letter ordering them to pay for property damage.

=== Spoilsport ===
The Pinchguts are a mean family in the UK. They live in a horrible-looking house they refuse to tend to and the parents are so mean, they named their children Girl and Baby. Baby is the anomaly whereas Girl loves ruining people's happiness by destroying their fantasies: once, she forcibly shuts a ventriloquist's mouth to prove the dummy is not magical and she reveals Baby's birthday presents before he opened them. One evening, Baby's milk tooth falls out at dinnertime and he gushes his excitement of getting money from The Tooth Fairy. Girl snaps that fairies are not real, but when Baby finds money under his pillow the next morning, Girl insists it is from their parents. Ma and Pa are confused.

In the middle of fighting a bacteria army attempting to climb the enamel castle walls, The Tooth Fairy is played a recording of Girl declaring fairies are not real by a gum goblin, Head of Intelligence. Excited, she and her team create a plan to avenge the non-believer. At the Pinchguts' home, Baby is still crying so Ma and Pa lock him in the back garden to sleep off the misery in the dog kennel. Girl is delighted as she settles into bed but wakes up to her mouth being clamped open by dental equipment and someone's voice rummaging around her teeth. The voice groans at Girl's jolting freak-out, claiming they nearly remove her tonsils, and a tooth flies out of Girl's mouth. The Tooth Fairy follows, scolding Girl's scepticism and produces a pneumatic drill, making Girl faint. In the morning, Girl's parents show no sympathy at her toothless mouth and make jokes at her expense about dentures, whereas Baby—still in the garden—bounced around, vindicated.

Girl leaves the house and gives an elderly dog a bone that breaks out a tooth, which she sneaks under her pillow to be collected. Despite her team assuming it to be a trap, The Tooth Fairy arrives in Girl's bedroom. Girl grabs her, armed with a slipper, and demands to be taken to her castle to get her teeth back. The Tooth Fairy explains that Girl's teeth are durable enough for her castle to be repaired but she obeys. The Tooth Fairy's team reluctantly hand back Girl's teeth just as the bacteria army reappear. The leader spots Girl's teeth (now back in her mouth) and his army attack, leaving a brown sludge puddle behind.

Girl's remains are returned to her family and she is buried in a fizzy drink bottle. Ma and Pa are thrilled because it is cheaper than a coffin and Baby is excited about his next tooth loss. When the Tooth Fairy arrives to collect his next tooth sometime later, he tells her to send his love to Father Christmas, leprechauns, the Easter Bunny, the stork that delivers babies, and the Yeti; she later does.

=== Dirty Bertie ===
Mr and Mrs Barf always laugh at their surname because it sounds like "bath". They are the cleanest people around, having three baths a day and basing their married life on the phrase "Cleanliness is next to godliness", hoping that being clean and having a dust-free house will get them into Heaven. Meanwhile, their son, Bertie, is always filthy with food stuck to his clothes. The only time he cares about being clean is when he uses his toothbrush to clean the soles of his trainers. When his father asks him to bathe, Bertie refuses because it will drown the insects living in his hair. When his parents try to clean him as he sleeps, but they are caught by Bertie's homemade booby traps.

Most boys love being dirty, but Bertie believes they are cowards for failing to maintain it. When his parents lose their patience, he tells them he wants a career in this "profession"; an astronaut, he decides, after being pressured into an answer. He leaves his parents astounded and goes into the back garden to build a rocket out of anything he can find. As he plays pretend and hunts for aliens, his parents decide to shock Bertie into having a bath by writing a Lonely hearts ad for a girlfriend. The next Saturday, five girls arrive on the doorstep but they are terrified of Bertie's filth, and Bertie is terrified of them — the fifth girl never knocks the front door because she sees the fourth vomiting in a hedge.

The sixth customer is a Bertie clone, who then turns into an alligator-kangaroo-blobby hybrid. This is PygAlien, who has escaped from the planet Tharg because he accidentally kissed a 900-year-old hag in a discotheque, and crashed his spaceship nearby. Due to Bertie's body odour, Pyg wants to borrow his rocket to get back home, because Bertie smells like an astronaut. As the two of them go to the garden with Bertie protesting he is not a real astronaut, the front door bursts off its hinges and lands on Mrs and Mr Barf as a wrinkled, long-nosed alien in makeup enters with two suited walruses. In the garden shed, Pyg is frustrated because Bertie is refusing to show him how the rocket works, paranoid that Putrid might be in hot pursuit with her brothers. The shed door opens and Putrid enters. She spots Bertie and decides that she prefers him to Pyg because of his face and smell. The walruses grab Bertie and they all leave for home to get married. Back on Earth, Pyg lives happily ever after with Mr and Mrs Barf disguised as a cleaner Bertie Barf.

=== The People Potter ===
In Worcester, 1777, a group of children were playing with a pig's bladder and accidentally launched it through the window of Josiah Reeks the potter's workshop, destroying a career's worth of Reeks' art. He caught them attempting to retrieve it and reappeared from his workshop three days later with twelve, life-size, porcelain statues. This story is known as the legend of The People Potter.

In the present day, there is Greta Gawky, a clumsy girl who is 2 m (6 ft 7 in) tall. She once went fishing with her father and cast her hook so wildly that a car swings itself into the river after her hook drags off its handbrake. Children jeer "Lawks, it's Gawks!" when she walks into a classroom before she can knock the blackboard off the wall, and she once slaps a dog up a tree when she tries to pet it. Because of her accident-proneness, Greta's parents have hidden a Ming vase behind wellington boots, hoping Greta will never touch again. When Greta is nine, the vase fell on the dog and broke two ribs, then she nearly melts it with a candle, then she burnt her parents' homemade protecting cage, and then her head got stuck in it when she (and the toilet) crashed through the ceiling. Her parents warn her that if she ever touches the vase again, she will become a celery-eating maid in a Clapham Common mansion while they are sold into slavery in Marrakesh. Greta hates celery, so she tries her best to obey ever since.

To celebrate, Greta is given a tiny porcelain figure of Josiah Reeks. Greta assumes he is a waiter, at first, and her parents gleefully tell her about the People Potter legend. As they cackle, Greta becomes uncomfortable with the figure almost immediately, particularly after reading a little message on its side that says "I'm coming back from China" if it breaks. This makes her even clumsier than usual—especially when she is the same room with it, feeling the character's eyes watching everything—and during one messy morning, her parents leave with orders to clean the house by the time they return. Greta's cardigan button had fallen off in the commotion and she rushes around to look for it, falling down the stairs and crashing through the floor into the cellar, and then destroying a pipe she tries to climb up, being sprayed through the hole and through the ceiling to the bathroom. Determined to save the Ming vase, Greta attempts to get back to the hallway to check it was still intact by the wellington boots, but it causes a domino effect of destruction through different rooms until the house collapses, save herself and the front door, whereas the Josiah Reeks figure is in pieces. The front door swoops open to reveal the real Josiah Reeks with a potter's wheel. Later, Greta's parents arrive home with nowhere to live and find a porcelain statue of their daughter. The Ming vase is still intact, however.

=== It's Only a Game, Sport! ===
According to the disclaimer, this story is once told by an Australian bushman after drinking six amber nectars. It is about a boy named Bruce, the son of the most famous and successful athletics couple in Australian history, who fails at every sport he touches. He easily loses his temper and immediately turns to sabotage and excuses. "It's only a game!" his Games teacher once groans when Bruce begs him not to announce the current score, so Bruce bites his leg.

His parents, now-retired athletes Shane and Sheila, encourage the behaviour to the fullest. From birth, they teach him that losing is not an option, even if he has to cheat. When Bruce and his broom partner lose a Sports Day Three-legged race, they order him to steal the hammer from the hammer throwing area and attack the winners. The school bans Bruce from participating in sports, and then expel him after the school burns down. Bruce has to stay at home because other schools refuse to teach him, so Bruce uses his free time to invent his own games to play against his younger sister, Kitty, and changes the equipment and/or rules so he wins constantly.

Kitty is also terrible at sports—preferred agricultural activities, so her bigger and aggressive brother has an advantage on top of his sabotaging: after winning boxing and basketball, they play "Bush Snooker" with hedgehogs for balls and aim them at kangaroos, but Bruce unties the kangaroos when it is Kitty's turn and the kangaroos hop away. During Trivial Barbeques, Bruce gives his sister the difficult questions. At bedtime, he demands they race to be the first one in bed and puts a spider in Kitty's pyjamas.

Kitty tolerates the games but she loathes Bruce's threats, boasts, and name-calling. She suggests they play Snakes and Ladders and her successful dice rolls put her far in the lead. Bruce's frustration turns him back into a stubborn sore loser who demands that the rules should be changed: ladders send players down and snakes send players up. Kitty agrees and continues winning whereas Bruce reaches the top of a ladder. Bruce insists the rules should be changed back to normal and accuses her of cheating. He picks up the playing board and throws it out of the house, trips over the pet koala in the doorway, stumbles over the balcony ladder and falls towards a group of snakes.

=== Fast Food ===
An ambulance carrying a patient in a critical condition has just left the scene of a hit and run. A policeman also travelling with them asks for the patient's side of the story. The patient explains that he sees a car and tried to eat it because he wants to eat fast food like the rest of the world. The policeman points out a car is too big to be eaten and the patient admits he realises before it hits him and looked tinier when it was further away. The paramedics try to move the policeman aside so they can inject the patient but the policeman insists he needs the answers to "save lives". The patient dies, revealed to be a flattened hedgehog.

=== Sock Shock ===
Nick loves being the different child: he never wears shoes, wears his hats inside out, and ignores emergency signs in the street. When he waits for his socks to be cleaned one day, the washing machine temporarily freezes. Once the washing finishes, he opens the door and discovers that one of his socks have disappeared. He calls the police and prints out missing posters; no fingerprints are inside the machine. Nick is kidnapped by forty long fingers and dragged inside the washing machine, travelling through the waste disposal pipes and landing in a smelly cave. A match lights a hurricane lamp, revealing a scaly goblin with bulging eyes and sharp teeth. The light also reveals several tiny holes in the walls surrounding them, leading to every washing machine in the world. Nick fears the goblin will kill him but the goblin denies the thought — the socks he collects are used for injured worms as sleeping bags and the patients insist on different-coloured beds; Nick is a false alarm kidnapped accidentally, mistaken for an overlooked sock. He puts on makeup and leaves to film an interview for a documentary, telling Nick he can leave the way he came. Now there is no entity waiting to avenge Nick for wanting to be different, he never, ever wears shoes.

=== Revenge Of The Bogeyman ===
"Digger" Dee always picks her nose wherever she goes. Her parents are disgusted — they want a nice, polite girl, not a girl who behaves like a rowdy little boy — so her father yells that if she digs far enough into her nostrils she might pull out the Bogeyman. Dee is terrified at the thought but she picks her nose so much that her hand will continue to, without being prompted, as she sleeps.

One night, a voice wakes her up, ordering her to dig deeper. She looks around her bedroom and the bathroom but finds no one watching her and picks her nose again, pulling out a Yorkshire pudding-looking creature with limbs and a warty face, holding a pickaxe. He is the Bogeyman and is furious that Dee has evicted him from his home. "Just because we're small and easily flicked doesn't mean that bogeys don't have feelings too," he snaps, before eating her.

Dee travels through the Bogeyman's digestive system, sliding through tunnels and landing in caves. A finger pulls her out, belonging to a giant, who flicks her against the wall. Then a giantess steps on her and kicks her across the room into a dog bowl. As she tries to run away, she is found by the giants' son who attempts to eat her, but spits her out in disgust. She lands in the arms of the Bogeyman and promises to never pick her nose again. The Bogeyman is delighted and crawls back into her nose. Dee has kept her promise, but the temptation is too strong so she compensates with ear-picking instead. Unfortunately, she is in danger of pulling out The Waxwoman, who is worse!

=== Crocodile Tears ===
Mr and Mrs Howling cry easily. Mr Howling will cry for joy and pride like his family does, and Mrs Howling will cry in fear about any negative thought in her mind. Their daughter Gwendolyn exploits this by pretending to cry to get away with not doing homework, getting new outfits, eating fast food, watching the television, and her parents always believe her. One Christmas, one of her forced tears turn into a tear-sized duck, who warns her that Sakusaki the Old Croc—the father of crocodiles—will get her. It opens its bill and a glass tear falls out, showing Gwendolyn's face. Gwendolyn is not convinced and tells the duck that she has heard the story before, but becomes worried when her parents take her out to see a pantomime based on Peter Pan and does not decide to cry but throw tantrums instead, embarrassing her parents as she fights with audience members in queues and screams until her parents buy her a programme and the merchandise outside the theatre. Noticing surrounding customers looking irritated by her behaviour, she decides to cry to get some sympathy. Mr Howling gasps as he looks at Gwendolyn's eyes which have turned green. A giant tear falls out and turns into a giant crocodile, which eats her in front of her horrified parents and audience. The crocodile does an impression of Gwendolyn and wails that he ruined the evening. The audience applauds, assuming that it is part of the play, whereas Mr and Mrs Howling mournfully cry for a decade.

=== The Pie Man ===
Donald has always sucked his thumb, even as he sleeps. It begins a few days after his birth and confuses all hospital staff who interacts with him. A midwife warns his parents that The Pie Man (also known as the Patty Man and Filo Fella) might visit him if he never stops, and chop off his thumbs to hold up pie pastry tops. When the new family are discharged, Donald's parents agree to stop their new son's habit any way they can. They began by pulling his hand away, immediately discovering Donald's mouth has a strong grip, so they tickle his nose as he sleeps and slides a dummy into his mouth before he sneezes. This later backfires as Donald ages, sucking the dummy everywhere he goes; he destroys several objects in the living room from finding substitutes whenever it goes missing. The family doctor suggests to his parents they should try to throw the dummy away but during the first attempt with Donald's father on rollerskates, Donald draws breath so hard, the dummy flies out the bin and back into his mouth.

Now at eleven-years-old, Donald still sucks the old dummy and every person he walked past in the street stared. The family visits Loch Ness and his parents show him the monster's alleged sighting, where his mother pulls the dummy out with a monkey wrench and throws it into the loch. Donald jumps in to rescue it but retreats when he hears growling. As the family leave in the car for home, Donald is restless as his parents are still celebrating. He sticks a thumb into his mouth and turns contented as his parents drive back, buy scuba diving equipment and dive into Loch Ness to find the dummy. To their horror, Donald disgustedly rejects it because his thumb tastes better.

At home, a kindly pie seller arrives at the front door. Donald's parents run to his bedroom door and order him not to suck his thumb as Donald watches the salesman from his bedroom window. The salesman travels up on the steam from the pies and Donald lets him in. An empty pie dish is taken out of the man's basket and he asks for Donald's hands, but Donald refuses to stop sucking. The man tries to pull his hands away but they do not move. Donald gloats, making the man smirk, and Donald is dragged off his feet and pushed into the pie dish. Donald's parents break into the room to find it empty, apart from a steaming pie on their son's window sill.

=== Bunny Boy ===
Bill hates vegetables to the point of making Tubs the neighbourhood rabbit sneak into the garden to feast on his mother's vegetable patch every night. His mother decides to stand guard with a shotgun which prevented Bill from leaving the garden gate open. The next morning, she proudly serves him a freshly grown cabbage for lunch. Bill paints it like a football and leaves it for the dog to bite, buries it and pretends he discovered a bomb with homemade signs, tells the police he found a severed head, but his mother always finds the cabbage, washes it and places it in front of him again. Desperately, Bill snatches the cabbage and hides it under his anorak as he sneaks out of the house to find Tubs through Farmer Popple's cornfield. Exhausted, Bill rests by Tubs' rabbit hole as Tubs napped after his meal; a shadow casts over them as Popple's combine harvester runs them over.

Bill wakes up in hospital and is discharged the next day. To both him and his mother's surprise, he gleefully eats every vegetable served. He begins having recurring dreams about a rabbit eating garden vegetables, and waking up with soil in his mouth. One day, he discovers a fluffy tail growing and runs out of the bathroom to show his mother, discovering the doctor from his hospital bedside in the kitchen. "I knew this would happen," the doctor sighs. He explains to Bill's disturbed mother that the combine harvester accident mutilated Bill and Tubs so much that it is difficult for the surgeons to differentiate human and rabbit remains; Bill's rabbit instincts are predicted to develop at some point. Bill's mother demands her son should be changed back but the doctor claims it is impossible, as Bill uses his giant rabbit feet to kick open the back door, and hops out the house. He never returns again, now living in a nearby burrow, and only visits the garden every night for dinner as he hears his mother's loud sobs.

=== Spit ===
A little boy spits on the pavement. He actually spits on a giant's shoe, so the giant responds by spitting on him.

=== Superstitious Nonsense ===
Penelope Jane has legally changed her name to Pylon because "Jane" is Gaelic for "pie-shoveller". She is intensely paranoid, refusing to say (or be involved with) the number "six", shaking hands with the postman to receive positive letters, telling her mother to put on a shirt before her trousers to prevent ants, and reciting the alphabet backwards so that her clothes will stay clean. One day, her parents (Mr and Mrs Gaslamp) notice an alder tree in the garden, which her father attempts to pull out. Pylon claims it is the sign of a witch as Mr Gaslamp successfully removes it, and decides to divorce her parents for ignoring her.

After visiting the library the next day, Pylon lies to her parents that a vampire will attack her if she does her homework and that teachers cause insanity. Her parents agree to never send her back to school and give her all the money in their bank accounts. Pylon uses the money for a trip around the world and returns to her peasant parents demanding they give her custody of the house because of an Incan belief she discovered in Peru. Mr and Mrs Gaslamp move out, leaving Pylon with everything.

On Friday 13th, Pylon prepares preventatives for her house. She panics when she realises she breaks several of her own rules as she walks to the shop, and breaks several more when she rectifies her mistakes. She drags a giant metal box into the garden and climbs inside to save herself, which is then crushed by a cow that fell out of the sky. Mr and Mrs Gaslamp move back into their home and install a plaque for her grave with a rhyme about how grateful they were she has gone.

=== Head in the Clouds ===
Brian the "Butterfly Brain" is always daydreaming, which makes him forgetful. The last time his parents will see him every morning would be at breakfast because they will have to look for him hours later when he does not return home because he is lost somewhere in town. One afternoon, he accidentally walks a different direction and stops in a field with two kites flying in the sky above him. He pretends to be a kite as he runs down a hill but a strong wind trips him up, and he falls over, snapping his head from his neck and launching it into a tree. He can still feel his body as if it is still connected together but his toes can feel sensations from his mouth and eventually finds his head resting on bracken.

Headless Brian leaves the field and walks through the town, holding his head by his side. He enters a store named The Body Shop where the shop assistant examines his head, discovering it full of clouds. The shop assistant offers Brian a choice between switching heads with an available spare or waiting an hour to clean out the head. Brian chooses the latter option and receives a red ticket and an irreplaceable silver key. Brian enters the waiting room and daydreams that he is Rapunzel and tosses his hair for his prince to climb, throwing the key and ticket out of a window. When the shop assistant calls him for collection, Brian's body cannot find his ticket, but the shop assistant is hesitant to give him his head's box, no matter how much Brian begs. The shop assistant allows Brian to take the box home to wait for the eyes to open so that he can unlock it, but Brian returns home realising he cannot find his key either. The eyes in his head open and flinch at the giant clouds surrounding his face.

=== When the Bed Bugs Bite ===
Hannibal loves the sound people make whenever he bites them. For nine years, he has bitten everything, from people to animals to objects, which has made his teeth sharpen into fangs. His embarrassed parents hope that he will change but Hannibal enjoys the attention he got and has chewed at their earlobes and removed some of their fingers. One evening, they confront him with a broken car headrest and a bill from the Natural History Museum to pay for teeth damage on T-Rex bones but Hannibal ignores them and eats it, so they send him to bed early and snap that they hope that the bed bugs bite him. Hannibal falls asleep, confused by his parents' threats, and has a nightmare about a giant "queen bug" flying through a busy street, touching children (including Hannibal) which makes them disappear; Hannibal is teleported to his bedroom where the queen bug is waiting, who drips black saliva over him that hardens like a cocoon.

Hannibal wakes up disturbed, but continues his biting behaviour throughout school time, and is later suspended after he bites the headmistress' bottom. His enamel begins to itch and the teeth bite at their own accord. When they bite through a lollipop lady's sign, she is hit by a truck and bounces onto the pavement, which gives the truck a huge dent, and stands up to check on Hannibal, feelers expose under her hat.

At home, an exterminator dressed in black on a motorbike arrives to remove the bed bugs from Hannibal's room. She prepares her vacuum cleaner and is directed to his bedroom. Hannibal is ordered to demonstrate how he sleeps. The exterminator pushes the vacuum cleaner through Hannibal's pyjamas and leaves once the rattling in her cleaner had disappeared. As Hannibal sleeps, insects from his pyjamas crawl around his body and bite into his flesh, as he has another nightmare about the queen bug dressed in black. In the morning, he terrifies his parents at breakfast and leaves for school, terrifying everyone he walks past, and causes the school playground to run amok. The headmistress yells for someone to contact an exterminator and Hannibal looks in a nearby window, discovering his reflection looking like a bed bug humanoid. A motorbike enters the playground, driven by the exterminator, who crushes him with a shoe. Faraway, an old lady, who lives in a block of ice between the Napashere's Land of Dreams and the Valley of Nightmares, presses the erase button on her answerphone.

=== The Decomposition of Delia Deathabridge ===
Delia is the daughter of Oxford University professors, so she refuses to participate in schoolwork and mocks students that obey. One day, her English class discover their teacher is going to be absent for several weeks and become replaced by the substitute teacher, Miss Whetstone. Delia fails to outwit her and is ordered to complete her homework as the rest of the class read quietly. Delia declares that she has no need but Miss Whetstone smugly suggests that Delia should be given homework more difficult. Delia reluctantly writes an essay—titled "My Worst Nightmare"—about a warty, bearded, big-footed beast breaking into her bedroom and turning her stupid, but stops in the middle of a sentence when the school bell rings.

At home, Delia abandons the essay and shoves the exercise book under her bed. As she slept, the book shoots across the floor and shakes, filling the air with foot odour. In the centrefold is a picture of a man with long fingernails, which moves and orders her to release him by finishing the story. Miss Whetstone is unimpressed when Delia claims the beast she wrote about prevented her from finishing the essay and forces her to finish within the lesson. Delia quickly erases any negative adjectives and writes a happy ending that the now-friendly, wish-granting troll will disappear. Miss Whetstone rejects the essay, believing the twist ending does not work, and adds with a sadistic smirk that she will rewrite it for her; Delia faints.

The epilogue reveals that Delia returns to school the next day as a ditz but worse. It is revealed that Miss Whetstone's rewrite is about a troll breaking into Delia's house and pushing his fingernails into her ears, bursting her brain lobes. Then he eats Delia's intelligence and leaves to write the Encyclopædia Britannica.

=== The Grass Monkey ===
Ten-year-old Spike has spiky hair, large ears and lives with his ill mother in a caravan. They own an underweight cow named Ruby, but they do not live near a grassland so she cannot produce milk. One morning, Spike leaves for school but fails to shut the front door properly, and Ruby watches a brown-tailed creature sneak inside. When school is over, Spike goes to a hairdresser's to sweep trimmed hair off the floor. That day, a beautiful girl with blonde hair is the only customer, who shoos him away when he tries to sweep around her chair. She is Esmerelda who aspires to become a fashion model, preparing to enter the annual Miss Golden Locks competition with a £50 prize, a modelling audition, and a dedicated float in the summer parade. A lovestruck Spike offers her a mug of tea but she pushes it out of his hand, dampening his school trousers.

Her parents barge into the shop and scold her for disobeying them, which begins an argument as Esmerelda protests that she knows that she can trust the hairdressers to not damage her hair. Spike interrupts with a shriek as the hot tea soaks through to his legs so Esmerelda claims that she and Spike are in a relationship. Spike is confused but thrilled and does not suspect Esmerdela's scheming. Before she is forced to leave with her parents, she asks him to steal shampoo and give it to her at home. Despite his hesitance, Spike takes a dozen shampoo bottles when Sandra the hairdresser is out of the room and stuffs them in a bin bag full of trimmed hair. When he arrives home, he showers and changes his clothes and covers his body with the hair, remembering when he overheard Esmerelda telling Sandra that she is attracted to hairy men. Suddenly, his mother stands by the front door and explains that a monkey-looking hobgoblin has visited her in the morning to grant her a wish. She shows him magical grass seeds to plant once a day, but Spike is distracted and leaves to deliver the shampoo.

Esmerelda screams when she sees Spike, assuming he is a monkey, but claims that she sees rats when her parents catch her. Spike shows her the shampoo he brought but Esmerelda is furious because he forgets the Nowtincide shampoo and orders him to get it tomorrow otherwise she will lose the Miss Golden Locks competition. The next day, Spike is still guilty while his mother begs him to look at the fresh grass that Ruby was eating. After school, he arrives at the hairdresser's, discovering Sandra waiting for him at the front door to fire him. Esmerelda kicks him in the knee when he tells her that he cannot get any new shampoo for her. Spike runs home, steals the magic seeds and offers them to her. Esmerelda ignores his warning of eating one seed and eats everything out of the sack.

The next morning, Spike's mother is devastated that she cannot find her magic seeds and an excited Esmerelda knocks on the caravan door with her blonde hair now a train of grass. All she needs to do is dye it blonde, she explains, but grass grows rapidly out of her skin and covers her entire body. Ruby rushes towards her and eats her before Spike can react, but the magic seeds continue to grow inside her stomach, turning her fur into grass. She never produces milk again, but Spike and his mother became millionaires that travel the world, showing off "Ruby the Mow Cow", who appears in freak shows and television commercials.

== Development ==
To both celebrate and promote the announcement of a cartoon adaptation of the book series, Rix created More Grizzly Tales. He had planned to develop said adaptation from since 1993 by using his producer credits from his production company Elephant to send Grizzly Tales for Gruesome Kids to numerous television studios. Elephant and animation producers Honeycomb Animation were given a two-series deal with ITV studios with a budget over US$2.5 million for 30 episodes; the cartoon would begin airing on the CITV timeslot in January 2000. The previous three books in the series were rereleased by Scholastic Books (apart from Fearsome Tales, which was owned by Hodder) with the front covers re-designed by Honeycomb Animation, imitating the future screenshots of the cartoon.

== Publication history ==
This was the only book in the original series that did not have an illustrator, whereas the previous three's first editions had Bobbie Spargo (Grizzly Tales, Ghostly Tales) and Ross Collins (Fearsome Tales). The front cover was designed by Honeycomb Animation, the producers of the animated adaptation, in the style of the CITV series; the first series had just aired the year before in 2000.

The book is said to have officially gone out of print in 2010. It was briefly available on Kindle in 2011, published by Orion.

Pub. date	Format	No. of pages	Publisher	Notes	ISBN	Ref.
19 January 2001	Paperback	304	Scholastic Limited	Under Scholastic's (now defunct) Hippo children's book branding	ISBN 9780439998185, 0-439-99818-2	
1 September 2001	Audio Cassette	319 minutes	Chivers Children's Audio Books	Read by Bill Wallis	ISBN 0754052559, 978-0754052555	
2011	E-book	117		Self-published by Jamie Rix	ISBN 9781908285072, 1908285079	
2011, 2014	eAudiobook	5h 19m 26s	AudioGO	Audio from Chivers	ASIN B00550KXSY; ISBN 9781408448373, 1408448378	
16 August 2016	MP3 Audiobook	5h 19m 26s	Brilliance Audio	Audio from Chivers	ISBN 9781531813994, 1531813992	
