= Fearsome Tales for Fiendish Kids =

1996 short story collection by Jamie Rix

- The first edition front cover, illustrated by Ross Collins.
- Author: Jamie Rix
- Audio read by: Nigel Planer (2000)
- Illustrator: Ross Collins
- Language: English
- Series: Grizzly Tales for Gruesome Kids
- Release number: 3
- Genre: Children's horror
- Publisher: Hodder Children's Books
- Publication date: 8 April 1996
- Publication place: United Kingdom
- Media type: Print (Hardback)
- Pages: 224
- ISBN: 978-0340667354
- Preceded by: Ghostly Tales for Ghastly Kids
- Followed by: More Grizzly Tales for Gruesome Kids
- Went out of print in May 2005

Fearsome Tales for Fiendish Kids is a 1996 children's black comedy horror book written by British author Jamie Rix. It is the third book in the Grizzly Tales for Gruesome Kids series. It was published by Hodder Children's Books and was the last in the series to be published before the animated series adaption by CiTV (and later, Nickelodeon), containing 16 short stories—one story more than the previous two books.

== Synopsis ==
=== The Cat Burglar ===
Fedora Funklefink is a notorious con artist who uses any way she can to avoid responsibilities or get rich quick. She forces girls to pay to use the girls' toilets, forges her mother's handwriting so that she could sit out of P. E. lessons, makes other schoolchildren pay to lick her mints, refuses to let her father use his car until he paid her for cleaning the windscreen, and uses mirrors in exams to cheat. On the way to plan her next get-rich-quick scheme, she spots a poster for a missing cat, offering a £10 reward. She rips the poster off, runs home, changes into a "hunting" costume, and kidnaps a black stray behind her garden. The mother of the missing cat's owner answers the front door when Fedora goes to deliver but her daughter, Angela Tearful, runs out past her mother, excited about reuniting with her cat, and sobs when she sees the black stray. Believing Tearful to be insane, Fedora sneaks away with the cat to try something else.

The black stray is given a makeover with paints, boot polish and anything Fedora can find until it matched the description on the poster. However, Angela and her mother are not convinced, possibly because the "makeup" was dripping and Funklefink's clothes were covered in it. The next day, she returns with a white Persian cat but she is denied money. Then Fedora returned with a dog, then a tennis racket, and then a pepperoni pizza, but Angela's mother yells "NO!" and slams the door every time. Fedora finally leaves, officially out of ideas and reluctantly decides to abandon the plan. Suddenly, a cat jumps out of a bush and is ran over by a car. It has white paws, a black tail, a marmalade body, and a diamond shape on its forehead. Fedora realises it is Angela's missing cat and takes her home to look alive with a bicycle pump. "Not you again," groans Angela's mother when she sees Fedora outside her the front door. Fedora shows off the dead cat and uses it as a ventriloquist's dummy to convince the family to hand her £20. Angela decides to give Fedora a £50 note and takes the cat in for a bath.

Fedora runs off to laugh maniacally about scamming yet another group of people and sees another poster for a missing cat on the same tree she found the previous with a reward of £5000. Fedora salivates thinking about how she will spend £5000 and hears purring behind her. She turns gleefully to find a circus tiger, which eats her whole. The circus owner later finds the tiger asleep from a stomach ache.

=== Mr. Peeler's Butterflies ===
The Mr Peeler nursery rhyme

Sleep, sleep, now close your eyes
Don't tempt our Mr Peeler
For if you lie awake at night,
You'll summon the Sleep Stealer.

Alexander uses numerous tactics to stay awake past his 7:30 pm bedtime by pestering his exhausted parents, such as taking time to put on a swimming costume, pretending to be interested in minute details of keeping his bedroom protected from creepy shadows, forcing his mother to search for his toys downstairs that he knowingly had in his room, and asking for water a few minutes later so that he could pretend to use the toilet. His parents (particularly his father) become angrier by the second, but Alexander does not break his naivety ploy.

By four o'clock, Alexander is asleep. His window latch creaks open and a sardine smell fills the bedroom. He wakes up terrified and calls for his parents. His father rushes in angrily and checks the window—it was closed—but only his mother admits she can smell the sardine, despite his father finding a sardine tin. Alexander denies throwing it there for a prank. "Then who did? Mr Peeler?" shouts his father, and then explains to his confused wife that Peeler was a character from a nursery rhyme he remembers from childhood. He leaves the room, followed by his wife, demanding Alexander to not bother them again for the rest of the night.

The window latch reopens and in creeps a man dressed in tweed clothing and holding a butterfly net with strange-looking butterflies surrounding him. He introduces himself as Mr Peeler. Alexander declares that he is not scared because he is still wearing his swimming costume. Peeler points out that he cannot call for his parents regardless because they are in a deep sleep. He moves to Alexander's bedside and explains he wants to help the boy stay awake, and takes out a key that opens sardine tins. With the key, he peels off Alexander's eyelids and uses the net to catch the rest of his butterflies, and dissects them into eyelids to stick onto his face, with Alexander's on the top. He floats into the air as he gloats, reopens the window and flies out, leaving a regretful Alexander with no eyelids, unable to sleep again.

=== Fat Boy with a Trumpet [a true story] ===
An anonymous student recounts the time the worst bully in their school is finally defeated. The bully in question is Johnny Bullneck, a pale-skinned, overweight and angry-looking twelve-year-old who enjoyed interrogating students at random and torturing them if one of their answers displeases him. One anecdote features Johnny ordering a boy named Miles to sneak out of school and look for three gallons of polka dot paint; the narrator adds that they and the rest of school believe that Miles is too embarrassed to return empty-handed because after he obeys, he is never seen again, and is rumoured to have relocated to Darlington under an alias.

One day, an overweight, bespectacled boy becomes a new student to the narrator's class, who carries a trumpet case. His name is Timothy and he becomes famous for performing for everyone on the playground. Johnny approaches him on the outskirts of the school grounds and orders him to remove his clothes so that Johnny and his gang can take a mandatory "medical photo". When Timothy obeys, the school bell rings and Timothy is given detention from the headmaster. Johnny continues to target Timothy, forcing him to take laxatives, stealing his glasses, and name-calling him about his weight. A girl named Tina briefly confronts Johnny and snatches Timothy's glasses out of his hand so Johnny decides to take the trumpet case instead. Timothy roars at Johnny and holds the trumpet case tightly, snapping Johnny into a sulking silence for a week and stunning the petrified audience into awe.

Johnny garners permission to borrow the school's cricket equipment and waits for school to finish. When school is over, it begins to thunderstorm as Timothy walks past. Johnny's gang jumps out of the shadows to roll him through mud and tie him up, positioning him in front of the goal net. Johnny appears and gloats about having the upper hand, taking Timothy's glasses and trumpet case as he explains his revenge plan: attempting to play Timothy's trumpet as his gang throws cricket balls at Timothy like a firing squad. Johnny puts on the glasses and takes out the trumpet, and begins to play as Timothy tries to see through his blurry vision. A lightning flash hits close to the ground and Johnny 's gang run away screaming as the rain stops. It becomes clear enough for Timothy to see Johnny's charred corpse with the rings of Timothy's glasses glowing red around his eyes. In the epilogue, the narrator recalls no one seeming mournful when the next school assembly announces Johnny's death, but personally admits they wish that Johnny had suffered longer during the accident because the headmaster had claimed it happened "in a flash".

=== The Chipper Chums Go Scrumping ===
Back in 1952, Algie visited his aunt Fanny and uncle Herbert, with his pet dog Stinker and his best friend Col in Kent for their summer holidays. They had created a gang, named The Chipper Chums, with three of the neighbourhood kids: the children of a Royal Navy captain, Alice and her older brother Ginger; and gentle giant tomboy Sam, "a girl with a boy's name" who slapped Dick Stick, the son of an underclass rat skin seller, for teasing her.

One morning before breakfast, Algie and Col decide to go on a picnic and look for an adventure. Aunt Fanny offers to pack them scones and Herbert's tomatoes; Ginger and Alice's mother gives them gingerbread men, and Sam's mother gives them a Victoria sponge cake. The group cycle through the fields and stop by a river next to an apple orchard. They decide to open the hamper and eat despite the time being 11 am and find scones covered in clotted cream, sardine sandwiches, a tin of spam, ginger beer and Uncle Herbert's tomatoes, along with the other families' donations. After finishing the picnic, the hot sun makes the children drowsy, and they fall asleep. The sun disappears behind a cloud when they wake up and Algie is disappointed that Sam (the noted logical member of the gang) suggests leaving for home despite only eaten lunch. Col suggests fishing from a string in his pocket and a stick he could look for by the riverbank, but the ultimate decision is given to Alice, who wants an apple from the orchard. Col is hesitant to scrump but Ginger and Algie point out that the orchard is too big for the owner to notice four missing apples.

The group tidy their picnic away and climb through a fence hole. Col cannot reach the branches and Sam fails to climb the trunk. Algie reminds them of a circus act they saw a week ago and suggests two members should re-enact it. Being the tallest, Sam allows Algie to walk up her back and pick the apples, and the four children begin to eat. A gunshot rings through the meadow and the orchard's owner appears: an angry, unshaven Farmer Tregowan with a shotgun. Stinker leaps at the farmer to protect the children but Tregowan shoots him in the chest, killing him at point-blank range. Algie threatens to tell his father about the murder, but Tregowan refuses to back down. The children attempt to apologise, even consenting to corporal punishment but Tregowan points out it will not bring the four apples back, so he has to squeeze every drop of juice out of them. Conveniently, the children become paralysed and collapse due to the insecticide that Tregowan often sprays around the orchard. He gathers their bodies onto his tractor and drives to his fruit press, where he crushes their corpses and drains out the juice for cider. The story ends with a warning that "if you ever come across Tregowan's Vintage Cider from 1952, do not drink it!"

=== Prince Noman ===
Somewhere in the desert is a town named Misery. It had been ruled for over 500 years by the House of Volgar. The aging king Norman had married a young, beautiful peasant named Letitia, who later gives birth to a son. When the newborn boy is ready to be shown to the rest of the family, each member passes the child around and gushes over the features he has inherited from each of them. Letitia points out they never mentioned any features that her son had inherited from her but her in-laws sneer and ignore her. The king wants to name his new son Norman, despite Letitia's hesitations, but at the naming ceremony, he forgets his reading glasses and misreads the name as Noman. The royal family are concerned and Letitia is horrified—"Noman" had unfortunate connotations because it could also be read as "No man".

In the days since the blooper, the royal staff have lots of trouble with the new prince, who's invisible. The royal family panics as the king's failing health and the prince's condition could destroy the monarchy. Letitia sews a babygrow out of lead from the rooftops with a balaclava but has nothing for the face itself. The royal doctor declares the king unfit for power and orders the Volgar family find a new ruler. The family immediately nominate Noman but Letitia protests that Misery would not trust a ruler without a face. Her sister-in-law, Princess Florrie, demands she finds a solution by tomorrow otherwise she would be buried alive in a sandpit near scorpions.

The next morning, the new King Noman is revealed to the people of Misery with a face identical to the one he had the day he was born. The rest of the family are absent, refusing to leave their bedrooms for the rest of their lives. Inside the palace, the servants are ordered to remove every mirror.

=== Death By Chocolate ===
Eli (right) defending herself against a giant fly (unknowingly, sister Serena); drawn by Kerstin Meyer for Scary Stories for Eight Year Olds.

The Squarebush-Sou'wester chocolate factory's boardroom is congratulating the sales of their chocolate Easter bunnies. Meanwhile, a worker named Pip Pipkin is greasing the chocolate bunny molds when he notices a fly, and when trying to swat it with his hands, hits a lever that causes excess amounts of liquid chocolate to pour out everywhere. Pip explains the situation to the foreman who freaks out when he mentions the fly and orders the factory equipment to be shut down at once. The news reaches the boardroom, and Mr. Squarebush drops his glass in fear. Mr. Sou'wester says it'll be the end of their company if the fly were to lay eggs in one of the factory's chocolate tanks; dead flies in chocolate would not be what the public wants. The company's SWAT team searches the factory only to come back to them, saying the fly's gone, and thus production on the bunnies resume. What they didn't know was that the fly had already laid an egg in a mold before leaving the factory through an open window.

The chocolate bunny is then sold to a fat chocoholic girl by the name of Serena Slurp, who'll eat anything chocolate: even if it includes chocolate dog food and living chocolate ants. She has a younger sister by the name of Eli, who's much kinder. Whenever Eli does something that she doesn't mean to, Serena will tell her to get her chocolate items, and if she doesn't comply, she'll tell their mother about it (albeit exaggerated). If Eli was ever caught however, Serena would act like she didn't know anything. During an August heatwave, swarms of flies come into the town where the sisters live, so their mother get a flyswatter to hit them with. Eli admires this and tries the flyswatter out herself; she has little success. Serena, however, freezes her chocolate supply in the fridge so it won't melt in the summer heat. One of these is the infected chocolate bunny. When given, she would always trick her sister by hiding her chocolate eggs, and when Eli grows hungry of it, she would eat it in front of her. One day however, Eli spots a slow three-legged fly on the couch, and when she tries to swat it, it flies off and as a result the flyswatter breaks. Eli tries her hardest to fix it (and hoping to keep it a secret) but Serena spots the broken swatter. Eli pleads to her that she won't tell, and Serena will only do so if she's her slave. She doesn't want to, only agreeing to it when Serena calls for their mother. Eli does every one of Serena's orders and chores: one of these being fetching her chocolate out from the fridge. Their mother only scolds Serena when she gets sick from indulging too much chocolate. Whenever Eli decides she has had enough of being Serena's slave, she threatens to tell their mother by holding the broken flyswatter. Two days before they were to go back to school, the heat has increased and all of the chocolate in the shops around Britain had molten. Eli tries 54 shops before coming home in tears. Serena gets angry and orders her to bring the chocolate bunny over. When Eli brings the chocolate bunny to her, she begins to gobble it down, but while she's eating, Eli notices a maggot in the bunny's neck. Eli tries to warn her about it but Serena ignores them, even thinking she's doing it so she can just get some of her bunny. Serena then proceeds to eat the maggot alongside the rest of the bunny. However, the maggot then enters Serena's stomach, and feasts on the chocolate in her, making it grow in size until it sucks her brain out.

Two weeks later, Eli comes into Serena's bedroom only to see a giant fly (which is really Serena) nestled in bed. She then runs out screaming but Serena chases her downstairs. Eli grabs the broken flyswatter and threatens to squish her. The giant fly begs and tries to prove to Eli that she really is Serena but Eli doesn't believe her, swatting her into a black mushy corpse. Their mother comes in and asks what's going on, making Eli finally confess about the flyswatter. She just says "Is that all? I thought it was something serious." before she leaves.

=== Well 'Ard Willard ===
Science nerds are the most shunned people in his school, so Willard left his science interests at home and spends schooltime pretending to be the most talented, namedropping, and globetrotting boy in the world. Younger students are in awe of his lies and envy Willard's interesting life, but are terrified of disappointing him; he got the nickname "Well 'Ard Willard" ("well hard" meaning "very tough") because he never smiled around anyone. One Friday lunchtime, Willard asks his audience if they had ever stolen something. Some students struggle to find an impressive answer to not embarrass themselves, but Willard scoffs at every confession, revealing that he stole the Sun. Through the crowd of impressed murmurs, a girl named Felicity calls him a liar and points out the sun is still in the sky. Willard claims he is telling the truth and that "the sun" she is referring to is a model he made. Felicity continues to accuse him of lying and the crowd disperses, realising Willard was not as interesting as they had believed for so long. In fear of losing his audience, Willard agrees to prove it and show everyone on Monday.

Willard plans to capture the sun in a similar way to the burning glass technique. Despite basing a reputation on far-fetched lying in school, he struggles to lie to his mother on the spot but she does not notice and allows him to borrow empty jam jars. Willard takes the jars and his telescope to a sunny field and captures sunbeam particles by angling the telescope's magnifying end towards the sun and placing the jars underneath the eyepiece, which he examines under his microscope back in his bedroom. He continues the process throughout the weekend until the entirety of the sun is hiding in jam jars under his bed. When Willard was out of earshot, his parents frequently refer to newspaper reports about worldwide scientists' growing concerns over the shrinking sun, comment on the early sunsets, and his boiling hot bedroom.

On Monday, Willard gathers his jars into a rucksack and staggers to school feeling triumphant about saving his reputation; a sign on the school gates reports the school is closed due to frozen pipes. Willard staggers back home to find his grey-skinned parents in the living room by the empty fireplace. They point out his sunburn (which he got from sleeping above his jar collection) and interrogate him about it. Willard struggles to improvise a few lies by claiming he built a time machine sometime ago and travelled back to a time when the sun was still in the sky so he could visit Australia, but when he returns to the present he destroys the machine and threw it away. His father is disappointed his son has made a time machine and never decides to show it to the rest of the family as his mother reads the newspaper. She finds an interview with the chief of the local police, who alleges Willard is the person who stole the sun because of his illuminating bedroom. Due to being members of the neighbourhood watch, Willard's parents immediately become suspicious.

Willard grabs his bag and runs to his bedroom, locking the door. He puts on oven gloves, opens his window and throws the sunbeam particles out of it, and pulls at his carpet to scoop other particles and tips the contents out with the rest, as his parents knock harshly outside. When the last of the sunbeams are out, all the hovering particles mould together into a sphere outside of the window and explode, burning Willard alive as the reformed and recharged sun floats away towards the atmosphere. Willard's parents break the door off the hinges and find his skin laying below the window pane. In the story's epilogue, it is revealed that three months later, the liquefied remains of Willard's body rain over Madagascar where a warthog drinks them.

=== Athlete's Foot ===
Oliver "Ollie" Littlebody is terrible at track races. He hates running and always falls over the finish line in last place. He is always competing against Anthony St John Smythe, who is always winning races and enjoys waiting for Ollie to cross the finish line to gloat about winning at him. After embarrassing himself at another track race, Ollie is approached by an old man, who offers to train him into a successful athlete that will stop Anthony's boasting and put his name at the top of the running leagues; although unconvinced, Ollie accepts. The next day, Ollie arrives at the stadium after school and is amazed to see the old man sprinting around the race track. When the old man finishes, he gives Ollie his training schedule: at the end of every school day, Ollie must go to the supermarket and buy soup, take it to the old man's house and cook it, and then clean up after dinner. Despite Ollie's protests, he reluctantly follows the old man's orders.

On the day of the running league's first race, the old man gives Ollie studded running shoes. They formerly belonged to a schoolboy named Tommy Knock, one of the best track runners in the county 50 years ago who failed to win a race that would cement his All England Schools Champion title. Ollie puts them on and reluctantly leaves the changing rooms for the race track. When the starting gun fires, Ollie sprints around the track, passes his opponents and wins the race. Ollie is in disbelief and regrets doubting the old man's strategy. He wears the shoes in other races, winning all and being promoted each time. He wins the semi-final race and is named the best 400m runner in British history by a magazine for young athletes, which is purchased by the St John Smythe family. Anthony, who is due to appear in the final with Ollie, is suspicious over Ollie's sudden success but is so furious that he eats some of the magazine pages.

In the minutes before the final, Anthony confronts Ollie in the changing room and steals the running shoes. Ollie tries to chase him but cannot move because his clothes are stuck to the seat, thanks to Anthony's secret glue container. The old man runs into the room in a panic and frees him. Ollie decides to forfeit the race and begins to cry, terrified that he will embarrass himself without his shoes but the old man convinces him to race and admits that he was going to give the shoes to Anthony anyway. Ollie accuses his mentor of betraying him but walks out to join the race, clothes ripped from being freed from the seat and with no shoes on. The race starts and Ollie struggles to overtake his opponents, whilst Anthony is far in the lead. Ollie hears the sounds of Luftwaffe planes and a loud whistle. Anthony explodes into ash as he is about to reach the finish line; Ollie staggers into seventh place.

When Ollie and the old man reunite by the changing rooms, the old man explains that Anthony's death was the reason why Tommy Knock could not win his final race in 1941 because he was killed by a Luftwaffe bomb that landed in front of him as he was about to cross the finish line. Ollie expresses his condolences to Knock who died trying to reach his dreams but the old man tells Ollie not to worry because "I didn't feel a thing," and disappears in a puff of smoke.

=== The Matchstick Girl ===
Eight-year-old Polly Peach lives with her family and 15 siblings in Victorian Britain. After her father is made redundant from the steel mill, she finds a job selling matchboxes and is paid twopence for every twenty sold. One day, the owner of the matchstick shop announces he is going to deduct her wage to a penny per 20 sales "because I said so." Remembering her parents warning her and her siblings about exploitative bosses, Polly threatens to strike. Suddenly, her hair catches fire from a phosphorescence flash and burns her body into a giant match. Her boss uses her body to clean the shag out of his smoking pipe and throws the rest of her remains into an ashtray. He closes his shop and leaves for his Blackpool holiday with his wife.

=== Simon Sulk ===
The story begins with an Icelandic legend about trolls, which are believed to be creatures that originally lived in the sea: 500 years ago in the village of Trollvik, the villagers hid in a church from wolves when travellers knocked on the front door begging to be rescued because their caravan was on fire. Thor, the villagers' leader, allows them inside but notices that there is no sign of smoke and fire. He realises his mistake but the doors had already shut and the travellers were beginning to shapeshift. They turn into wolfish humanoid beasts and slaughter every villager in the church. Due to the name of the village, this was where the creatures got their name, and they were eventually driven out of the country by King Magnus.

In the present day, spoilt Simon discovers that his parents want to move to Devon and have already bought a house. Known for his tantrums, Simon causes commotion in a clothes shop when he discovers the school uniform he will have to wear and locks his bedroom door when he gets home, vowing to die in the room if it means that he will never leave with his parents. He wakes up before 6 am to hear his parents arguing over what to take with them before the removal team arrives. When they hear him stirring, they try again to make him prepare to leave. Simon still refuses which further irritates his father. His parents leave and secretly plan to return 30 minutes later to call Simon's bluff, and drive to a café down the road.

Simon hears movement downstairs minutes later and his parents' voices at his bedroom door. He gloats that he knows that they will be back for him and still refuses to leave with them. His parents are in a panic because they have been chased back to the house by wolves. Simon gloats that he knows they are lying. The parents begin to scream because the house is on fire and Simon has to evacuate. Simon is still not convinced. The parents continue begging. Simon still refuses. The parents demand that Simon opens the door. Suspicious, Simon obeys and sees no fire outside the room as his parents barge in. He admits defeat but tells them that he has no plans of leaving regardless. His parents shapeshift into Icelandic trolls, and decapitate him.

Simon's real parents return to the house, as planned, to find the Icelandic couple from Devon that they have switched houses with answering the front door. They explain to the new owners the situation with their son being stubborn in his bedroom. The Icelandic couple invites them inside to help the parents convince their son to leave. Hours later, the Icelandic couple have a tiny housewarming party in their new garden, cooking giant pieces of "chicken" on a barbeque.

=== The Dumb Clucks ===
The Clucks are a family who live in Dork, Stargazy Pie; a village notorious for its stupid citizens. One rainy day, a cowboy smoking cheroot rides into the village and announces himself as the Son of God, a messenger of his father. The villagers are in awe as the cowboy explains that his father can make wishes come true to anyone who follows rituals. Mrs Cluck asks for hair rollers, one of their children wants a hoverboard and Mr Cluck asks for replacement golf clubs. The cowboy promises to get every wish if the Dorks followed his instructions. Mr Pojo the village cobbler accuses the cowboy of being a conman but his neighbours and customers ignore him. The cowboy orders the villagers to destroy their mirrors and dump the glass in a ring surrounding the village, burn all their shoes and cover themselves in ketchup and mustard. Mr Pojo is thrown out of the village for blasphemy and the Dorks obey the cowboy's orders.

The cowboy dials 666 on his mobile phone to contact "his father" and tells the villagers that God is ready for them. Heavy footsteps shake the village and a giant cyclops steps into Dork. "You have done well, son," it says to the cowboy. Mr Cluck asks for God and the cyclops replies that his name is Nigel. The cowboy admits that he lies to Dork and his father was no Fairy Godmother-esque wish granter. The Dorks try to run but realise they cannot run over the glass ring with no shoes on and Nigel eats all the villagers and the buildings, and leaves with his son for Bombay. In the years after the tragedy, a new village has been created: Pojo, which only has one citizen: the banished Mr Pojo from Dork.

=== Doctor Moribundus ===
Lorelei Lee never goes to school because she pretends to be ill every weekday, and her family believes it, no matter how implausible. During school holidays and weekends, she makes miraculous recoveries but will suddenly feel unwell on Sundays or the last day of the holiday and cannot go to school for a week. She will use a variety of methods to be convincing, such as placing thermometers in hot drinks, making herself cold at night, and create scars by waxing her limbs with plasters, only to be unusually excitable when her father arrives home at the end of every "sick" day with a get-well present.

One morning, Lorelei Lee covers her mouth with toothpaste and pretends to have a seizure. Her mother assumes she has rabies and telephones for yet another emergency doctor. Unlike the other doctors usually send into Lorelei Lee's home, the doctor recognises the tricks and smells the toothpaste. He writes out a prescription and leaves in a tranquil fury. Lorelei Lee's mother fails to find any medicine in any nearby pharmacies that match the prescription and asks her husband whether he has heard of "Medicus moribundus". Her husband scoffs at the need for said prescription now that the "rabies" had worn off their daughter but the doorbell rings.

On the doorstep is a bearded man wearing a cape and an overweight woman dressed in black. The man introduces himself as Dr Moribundus and the woman as his night nurse. The parents invite the guests inside and Dr Moribundus orders them to stay downstairs as he treats their daughter. Moribundus and the night nurse enter Lorelei Lee's bedroom and Lorelei Lee protests that she is fine but the two guests ignore her, preparing their equipment. The night nurse turns her over to cover her back in leeches and then rubs poultice mustard all over her body, as Lorelei Lee screams that she is healthy and promises to go to school every day. After the poultice is peeled off, Moribundus explains that he specialises in alternative medicine and prepares for brain surgery. Lorelei Lee points out that brain surgery seems unconventional but Moribundus replies that his method is alternate too and takes out a giant injection from his medical kit. She admits that she is pretending to be sick and begs to be reconsidered; Moribundus says, "I know," and injects the top of her head. The syringe sticks out the bottom of her body and she becomes numb, a hole growing through her tongue. Moribundus saws off the top of her head and digs around her brain with a teaspoon, pulling out a piece (which is said to be the part of her brain that makes her play sick) and eating it.

Lorelei Lee returns to school the next day and continues to do so. Still traumatised from Moribundus' visit, and with a hole still in her tongue as a souvenir, the epilogue reveals that she even hides common colds from her parents in case the witch doctor returns to her house, but has to stay home for a morning when a breeze blows the top of her head open so her head could be stapled shut. In her Latin class—the catalyst of her feigning rabies—the teacher asks for the definition of Medicus moribundus. A lisping Lorelei Lee suggests being injected in the head making the teacher laugh as he strokes his beard, which lookes similar to Moribundus' thin, black one.

=== The Stick Men ===
Chico has drawn on the walls with felt tips all his life, despite it annoying his wealthy (described as "Not now! Can't you see I'm working?") parents, who frequently point out that they never want him anyway as they scold him. One day, Chico's mother is horrified to find Chico's stick people and doodles buildings all over his bedroom walls and she and Chico's father ground him for two days, assigning him with yet another apathetic babysitter. Chico continues drawing, creating the enchanted land of Fiddle-Dee-Dee with a magical river where a blind sorceress lives in a castle and Knobbly Hobgoblins lurk in the caves. The babysitter appears in the doorway and harshly insults Chico's drawing abilities.

A stick man pulls himself off the wall and introduces himself as Stan after Chico stops screaming, calming him down. Other characters jump off the wall, pick up Chico's pens and draw all over every wall as Chico panics. Stan is too late to tell Chico to keep quiet as the leader of Knobbly Hobgoblins appears, takes a pen and draws Chico's babysitter with a snake growing out of her mobile phone. A scream is heard from downstairs, followed by the sound of the front door slamming shut. The hobgoblin draws two crashing helicopters before Chico wipes it out, chasing the hobgoblin away.

Through magic, Chico is taken to the sorceress' castle and the sorceress expresses gratitude to him and explains that a human living amongst the land of Fiddle-Dee-Dee would make the stick people come to life. Although wanting to stay, Chico believes it is his duty to stay with his parents, regardless of their treatment of him, but through the castle window, he sees his furious parents staring at the stick people's mess all over their son's bedroom. Chico's father rushes out and returns with a bucket full of soapy water and dumps it against the wall where the castle is drawn, trapping Chico inside Fiddle-Dee-Dee forever.

The epilogue reveals that Chico lives happily ever after with his new friends in Fiddle-Dee-Dee. Its citizens become human, the sorceress regains her sight and Chico's world becomes magical again. In the real world, Chico's parents die in a helicopter accident over the sea. When their bodies are recovered, their heads have inflated five times larger.

=== Little Fingers ===
Daffyd Thomas has a horrible-looking thumb. He uses to suck it frequently when he is younger and it now looks shrivelled and cannot grow fingernails. It seems that due to the lack of "affection", the thumb has "controlled" the hands into becoming fidgety and Daffyd is constantly told off by his parents for sticking his fingers in different places, regardless of sanitation. Exhausted by their son's behaviour, Daffyd's parents announce that they are going on holiday for a week, leaving their son with his 93-year-old, deaf grandmother, Gwenyth. Daffyd is devastated because his grandmother can talk for hours about boring parts of her childhood.

Four days of Granny Gwenyth later, Daffyd is still trapped in the living room with her as she talks about her memories and various hobbies. Instead of listening, he uses the house phone to perform prank calls until he has no desire left. He dials randomly and contacts an Italian pizza restaurant, which offers him a delicious-sounding "Kidnapped Caper". When he answers the front door, a man in sunglasses and a black suit with a machine gun is on the doorstep, who frogmarches him into a limousine and bashes him unconscious.

Daffyd's parents return from holiday over a week later to find envelopes full of fingers and ransom notes. When confronted, a confused Gwenyth admits she never notices her grandson has vanished nine days ago. Mr Thomas pays the £10,000 ransom and Daffyd is returned home the next day with only a thumb left on his hand. His mother appreciates that her son will not get into any more trouble for fiddling but he sticks it in his mouth to suck. His father tells her to look for the Bitter Aloe.

=== Bessy O'Messy ===
Bessy is a beautiful, red-haired, green-eyed Irish girl who is wasteful and forgetful. Her brother Callum is a neat freak, who cleans up after his sister, which makes Bessy suspicious, assuming that he is trying to make her look irresponsible. One morning, her mother discovers a mountain of dirty laundry and empty containers behind Bessy's bedroom door and orders her to clean her room. Bessy refuses, Callum offers to help, but their mother denies both of their requests. Bessy gets out of bed and attempts to climb the mountain but falls inside it and lands outside a cottage where six leprechauns live. They introduce themselves as O'Reilly, O'Reilly, O'Reilly, O'Reilly, O'Reilly, and O'Reilly (real name Rafferty) and explain that they prefer to live in untidy places. Bessy realises how much she and the leprechauns have in common and agrees to live with them for the rest of her life.

The leprechauns lead Bessy into their home and refer her to the kitchen. Confused, Bessy asks what was the kitchen's significance. The leprechauns tell her that as their new housekeeper, she must clean whatever they say. Bessy argues that they never said that she wants to be their housekeeper and the leprechauns remind her that they shake hands, but Bessy points out that they never mention housekeeping and that she and one of the leprechauns shake hands on no agreement. The leprechauns shed their fingers and grow claws, and threaten her to clean their kitchen otherwise they will kill her. Bessy shoves the closest out of her way and runs out of the cottage. She runs towards the assumed escape route—a black hole under a jumper—as the leprechauns chase her. The hole disappears and the ground shakes. The leprechauns gloat that they have the upper hand as they pull themselves off the ground and crowd around her. A jet of water sprays the leprechauns flat and the world crashes down.

Sometime later, Callum is ironing the rest of Bessy's clean clothes. He finds his sister, now 6 inches (15 cm) tall, with her red hair now white. She snaps at him for making "[her] colours run" and apologises for her behaviour, offering to help him clean her room.

=== Jack in a Box ===
The Honourable Jack Delaunay de Havilland De Trop (Note: /dəlɔːrŋiː dəˈhævɪlənd dəˈtʃroʊ/) embarrasses and angers his parents because he frequently interrupts adults' conversations. Anecdotes show him interrupting his mother at a party, the Queen, the Prime Minister, and a couple in the middle of flirting, offering to show them the verruca on his foot.

On the day of his sister's birthday party, Lord and Lady Delaunay de Havilland De Trop has approved of a self-hiring children's entertainer, Mr Frankenstein the ventriloquist. Jack pesters Frankenstein throughout his visit, isolating him in an empty room from Rosie and her guests, bombarding him with questions, interrupting constantly, and offering to show the foot verruca. Jack finally stops when he hears a panicky, muffled voice coming from Frankenstein's suitcase. Frankenstein opens it to reveal a ventriloquist dummy, which jumps out of the box to latch itself onto the back of Jack's neck and warns him to run away. Jack believes it to be a trick at first but Frankenstein adamantly claims the dummy is magic, and says he can teach Jack about the powers of the Elders of the Black Circle. He passes Jack an address card to a joke shop in Great Pessaries and lets in his audience.

The next day, Jack sneaks to the joke shop and allows himself in. A back door creaks open. Jack steps in the room calling for Frankenstein as he looks at the creepy ornaments on the shelves, with eyes secretly following him whenever his back turns. Disturbed, he turns to leave but stops when he sees severed heads of children hanging from wires over 30 transparent tanks of bubbling formaldehyde. A light turns on and the heads come to life, yelling at him to get out of the shop immediately. Frankenstein enters, in the middle of sewing a new dummy, and picks up an axe as Jack begs for mercy.

A few weeks later, Jack's parents are still concerned over their daughter, who stands in the garden mumbling a song that begs for her brother to come home. Lord Delaunay de Havilland De Trop opens a suitcase and pulls out a dummy with a sewn-closed mouth, explaining he bought it from a Great Pessaries joke shop, hoping it will cheer his daughter up by reminding her of her love of Frankenstein's party performance. Lady Delaunay de Havilland De Trop points out the dummy reminds her of Jack. The dummy blinks.

== Development ==
Like the previous books in the series, Jamie Rix used aspects of his life, as well as the cautionary tale book Struwwelpeter. For the creation of "Little Fingers", he said: "[My mother] bought me Struwwelpeter and made me read a story called The Story of Little Suck A Thumb. (Note: Original German: "Die Geschichte vom Daumenlutscher") [...] That story was brilliant. I had nightmares for weeks. When I hear that story now I can still feel the scissors cutting through my thumb bones." As a child, Rix used to suck his thumb and his mother buying Struwwelpeter was the result of several failed attempts to stop him; Bitter Aloe was one of the plans, but Rix never explained how it was used, which might explain the ending of the story when Daffyd's mother leaves the room to get the aloe without explanation to how she is going to use it.

Rix admitted that he based the story of "Dr Moribundus" on himself because he used to pretend to be ill so that he did not have to go school: "Whenever I wanted to get off school, I told my mum I was sick and, lying in bed looking weak and feeble, I begged her for a cup of tea. When it arrived, I stirred the thermometer in the hot tea until the mercury was nicely warmed up, then showed my mum what a terrible temperature I had!" He also joked that parts of the story had similarities to Hannibal ("My story was first!").

The original front cover was illustrated by Ross Collins. After the cartoon series aired on CITV, the covers were re-designed by Honeycomb Animation, the producers of the cartoon.

The book is said to have officially gone out of print in May 2005. It was briefly available on Kindle in 2011.

== Cultural references, naming conventions ==
Ross Collins' title illustration for "The Chipper Chums Go Scrumping". (Note: Rix's writing does not describe many of the characters' appearances, however, from clockwise, right: Sam, Stinker, Alice, and Col. Ginger is described as tousle-haired, but no male character is described as wearing glasses.) The writing "and lashings of ginger beer!" above hints that the story will be an Enid Blyton parody.

Cultural references and naming conventions are used throughout to add to the humour in the short stories. Some titles of the short stories are play on words: "The Matchstick Girl" is Polly Peach's job description but then she turns into a working matchstick when she attempts to defy her boss; "Athlete's Foot" refers to the fungal infection and the magic trainers making the wearer win running races; "The Cat Burglar" relates to Fedora scamming people, Tiddles the missing cat, and the phrase cat burglar; and "Jack in a Box" ends with Jack's father opening a box to show his wife the dummy of Jack, with no relation to the children's toy. However, Mr Frankenstein the ventriloquist is a possible allusion to Dr Frankenstein because they used human anatomy for humanoid creations that come to life.

Characters' names like Bessy O'Messy and Serena Slurp implied their personalities: Bessy was untidy, whereas Serena was rude and greedy because slurping is considered bad table manners. Johnny Bullneck is described as "short-haired, flat-footed, white-fleshed and pudgy" but "bull neck" describes a thick neck, which is possibly what he had also. The locations in "The Dumb Clucks" relate to the intelligence of the family: they live in the Dork village full of other Dorks, in the land of Stargazy Pie (a Cornish desert) (Note: Cornish people are often stereotyped as being unintelligent) located between two mountain peaks, Feak and Weeble (a spoonerism for "weak and feeble"). The House of Volgar in "Prince Noman" imply that the royal family are obnoxious long before the treat Queen Letitia like an outcast after she gives birth to a prince.

There was also uses of irony: the Mr Peeler nursery rhyme character is a possible reference to the idiom "keep your eyes peeled" in which Peeler removes Alexander's eyelids by peeling them off. Moribundus is Latin for moribund; Lorelei Lee hated learning Latin at school and the prescription that her parents failed to fulfil was Medicus moribundus ("Doctor moribund"). After the formerly "well'ard" (Note: Contraction of "Well Hard", meaning "very hard". Hard (from hardman) is British slang that has multiple definitions but has similarities to the Bad boy archetype, the lovable rogue, and the antihero. Numerous dictionaries define hardman as "A tough, ruthless or violent man.") Willard's insides are melted by the sun he stole, the story's epilogue pointed out: "From the outset, Willard had been lying to save his skin. But what use is a skin when there's nothing left to go inside it?"

=== Pastiche ===
Although not explicitly stated, "The Chipper Chums Go Scrumping" is a whole-plot reference to The Famous Five series by Enid Blyton, and is written in her voice, specifically during the food porn paragraphs and in the dialogue. In the original hardback edition, Ross Collins' illustration of the main characters on a picnic has the phrase "and lashings of ginger beer!" written above them, which is a quote that is frequently mistaken to be created by Blyton (it originated from the Channel 4 parody Five Go Mad in Dorset). Like the Channel 4 parody, "The Chipper Chums Go Scrumping" is about a group of children and their dog on a picnic in the countryside in a southern English coastal county (Dorset and Kent). Famous Five stories were usually set in the fictional Kirrin Bay in an unspecified coastal area where the characters' summer holidays were spent.

Some members of the Chipper Chums have similarities to Blyton's main characters: Algie is possibly based on Dick because they are both obsessed with going on adventures and have an aunt named Fanny; Sam is the Chipper Chums' George, who is also a "girl with a boy's name" tomboy that took offence to anyone pointing out that she is a girl (in the CITV episode, Sam even had short, curly hair like George); Alice has similarities with Anne because she is the youngest (Anne begins the series as ten-years-old, however) but carries a teddy bear with her on the Chums' outing; and Stinker is a reference to the dog sidekick that Blyton's children-gang characters frequently have — such as George's dog Timmy, and The Secret Seven's Scamper — but it is also the nickname George gives a dog that she and the rest of the Famous Five meet in Five Run Away Together that is owned by housekeeper Mrs Stick and her rude son Edgar. Surname aside, Dick Stick may have been inspired by Edgar, despite appearing in a short anecdote to be rude to Sam.

Farmer Tregowan is a Cornish stereotype: his surname begins with "Tre", and he is portrayed as aggressive and unpleasant, refusing to accept the children's apologies when he catches them stealing from his orchard. His character is an anomaly but is similar to the angry antagonistic men that The Famous Five usually defeat, but he successfully outsmarts the Chipper Chums with his insecticide. Tregowan is one of the numerous references to classism that appears in the short story, that itself is a reference to the criticisms that Blyton's children's stories frequently receive: the Famous Five members have been accused of being entitled and prejudice, and that most of Blyton's books contain "snobbery"; Lou the working-class acrobat, who is revealed to be a thief/con artist, immediately dislikes the five children because they are staying in a caravan; and Mrs Stick is also a twist villain with a smelly, rude child who helped kidnap and imprison a girl for ransom. The Chipper Chums are heavily implied to be as prejudice too: after Sam attacks Dick Stick for calling her "Sam the man", it is noted, "How they laughed, to see Dick sent packing with a bloody nose and tears streaming down his unwashed face. [...] The Sticks were so poor that they didn't have two pork chops to rub together, but what did the chums care, so long as the sun blazed down all day and the ginger beer flowed like wine!" Later, when Tregowan confronts the children, Sam thinks to herself that he looked "uncouth" with his five o'clock shadow and that he reminded her of "the sort of man the police were always chasing." Their entitlement is shown during Tregowan's threats when they both beg and demand that he forgives them for stealing: Algie takes offence to Tregowan's tone of voice and orders him to put the shotgun down like "a good chap", and Col and Ginger explain that "fair's fair" if he strikes them before letting them leave. When adapted for CITV, these details were left out of the characters through shortening Dick Stick's teasing and removing Sam's thoughts.

== Adaptations ==
The audiobook was performed by Nigel Planer, who was also the voice of the narrator on the cartoon series and the co-founder of Jamie Rix's production company, Little Brother Productions. It was released in December 2000 by Chivers Children's Audio Books, and was re-released by Audible on 16 August 2016.

"The Matchstick Girl" was the only story that was not adapted for the CITV and NickToons cartoons. This is most likely because the story is significantly shorter than the rest.

With the rest, there have been changes in the adaptations. For example:

- "Doctor Moribundus" (Series 1, Episode 13) did not include Loralilee's brain surgery in the cartoon.
- "The Chipper Chums Go Scrumping" (Series 1, Episode 10):
  - Numerous characters either do not appear or are mentioned, such as Algie's aunt and uncle, and the rest of the children's parents who helped pack the picnic. Dick Stick's mother appears in the background of a shot when the force of Sam's slap throws Dick across the field and through his house's ceiling;
  - After Dick Stick is introduced to be attacked by Sam, the story cuts to the gang travelling through the countryside towards their picnic spot;
  - Stinker's murder is changed to Tregowan shooting him in his hind leg, and he is seen limping past Tregowan's cider-making shed.
- "The Cat Burglar" (Series 2, Episode 3) cut out a lot of Fedora's backstory which showed how much of a con artist she could be.
- In "Mr. Peeler's Butterflies" (Series 2, Episode 4), Alexander's father threatens that Mr. Peeler will come for him if he refuses to go to bed.
- "Well'ard Willard" (Series 2, Episode 13) melts when the sun goes into a supernova.
- "The Dumb Clucks" was renamed "The Dumb Klutzes" (Series 6, Episode 8)—along with the family—and any mentions of Christian deities are changed.
- "Jack in a Box" (Series 2, Episode 1):
  - Mr Frankenstein's surname is now Twigtaylor. He is also dressed colourfully, whereas the original story featured a character comment Frankenstein was dressed like an undertaker;
  - Great Pessaries is renamed Great Pudden (rhymes with "wooden");
  - Frankenstein's joke shop downplays the "Mad scientist" elements, making Jack more disturbed by the advertised dummies displayed around him. The implication of mutilated children is also removed, as Twigtaylor corners Jack with a wooden case for his torso instead of an axe.
- "Fat Boy with a Trumpet" removed the framing device of the anonymous student.

== Publication history ==
=== Reissues ===
Pub. date	Format	No. of pages	Publisher	Notes	ISBN	Ref.
8 April 1996	Hardback	216–224	Hodder Children's Books		ISBN 0340667354, 978-0340667354	
2000	Paperback	216–224	Hodder Children's Books	Front covers designed by Honeycomb Animation	ISBN 0340640952, 978-0340640951	
2000/2001	Audio Cassette	319 minutes	Chivers Children's Audio Books	Read by Nigel Planer	ISBN 0754051994, 9780754051992	
2011	Amazon Kindle	114	Amazon (Jamie Rix)		ASIN B00B8SNMX0ASIN B00572AUKQ; ISBN 9781908285041, 1908285044	
15 September 2011	eAudiobook	5h 19m 10s	AudioGO	Audio from Chivers Audio Books	ISBN 9781408449103, 1408449102; ASIN B005NIQKFI	
16 August 2016	MP3 Audiobook	5h 19m 10s	Brilliance Audio (Amazon Studio)	Audio from Chivers Audio Books	ISBN 1531807399, 9781531807399	

=== Singular stories ===
"Death By Chocolate" (along with Grizzly Tales for Gruesome Kids' "The Barber of Civil") was republished in 1998 by Macmillan Children's Books as part of the short story collection Scary Stories for Eight Year Olds by Helen Paiba. It was also republished in issue 28 of the Braille at Bedtime series by the Royal National Institute of Blind People, along with "The Chipper Chums Go Scrumping" and "Prince Noman". Other Fearsome Tales stories republished in other issues were "Well'ard Willard", "The Matchstick Girl" and "Athlete's Foot" (issue 38), and "Bessy O'Messy" and "Jack in a Box" (issue 40).
