= Grizzly Tales for Gruesome Kids =

Book series by Jamie Rix

- Created by: Jamie Rix
- Original work: Grizzly Tales for Gruesome Kids by Jamie Rix (1990)

Print publications
- Book(s): 13

Films and television
- Animated series: Grizzly Tales for Gruesome Kids (2000–2006); Grizzly Tales: Cautionary Tales for Lovers of Squeam! (2011–2012)

Miscellaneous
- Country of origin: United Kingdom
- Language: English

Grizzly Tales for Gruesome Kids is a series of award-winning children's books by British author Jamie Rix which were later adapted into an animated television series of the same name produced for ITV. Known for its surreal black comedy and horror, the franchise was immensely popular with children and adults, and the cartoon became one of the most-watched programmes on CITV in the 2000s; a reboot of the cartoon series was produced for Nickelodeon UK and NickToons UK in 2011 with 26 episodes (split into 2 series) with the added tagline of Cautionary Tales for Lovers of Squeam!. The first four books in the series were published between 1990 and 2001 by a variety of publishers (such as Hodder Children's Books, Puffin, and Scholastic) and have since gone out of print but are available as audio adaptations through Audible and iTunes. The ITV cartoon was produced by Honeycomb Animation and aired between 2000 and 2006 with 6 series; reruns aired on the Nickelodeon channels along with the 2011 series.

Each book in the franchise contained several cautionary tales about children of many ages and the consequences of their antisocial actions. Due to how far-fetched and fantastical the stories could become, it is up to the reader whether they found the series frightening or amusing, but the franchise is usually categorised as children's horror. When the series was adapted for the CITV/Nickelodeon cartoons, the book chapters became ten-minute episodes that were narrated by comic actor Nigel Planer, and created by Honeycomb Animation, with author Rix as co-director.

The franchise received critical acclaim, noted by the themes of horror surrealism and adult paranoia blended with common children's book absurdity. The Daily Telegraph said of the CITV cartoon, "Mix Dahl with Belloc and you can anticipate with glee these animated tales of Jamie Rix. Even William Brown's antics pale..." and The Sunday Times wrote: "They are superior morality stories and Nigel Planer reads them with a delight that borders on the fiendish."

== Plot ==
The Grizzly Tales series features short stories about cautionary tales and imitates an episodic anthology horror (similar to The Twilight Zone or Tales from the Darkside) with each book chapter a different short story. The typical structure would be a brief glance at a main character's typical day in their life, followed by a change in their routine (e.g. a new possession comes their way or a decision made by them/a supporting character) which eventually goes wrong in a hoisted with their own petard way, with the story ending with the main character either being killed, mutilated, involuntarily shapeshifting, or kidnapped by something/someone supernatural as punishment. They usually star children whose misbehaviour (laziness, greediness, vanity, lying, etc.) is failed to be reined in by their parents or guardians, who vary from encouraging it, ignoring it, failing to be firm with their punishments, or do nothing because they are used to being submissive (and are sometimes the victims of their child's abuse). There are exceptions, however, as some stories are about adults, or set in the past, or are pastiches.

== Book series ==
=== Development ===
Grizzly Tales for Gruesome Kids
- First series: Grizzly Tales for Gruesome Kids (1990); Ghostly Tales for Ghastly Kids (1992); Fearsome Tales for Fiendish Kids (1996); More Grizzly Tales for Gruesome Kids (2001); Second series (2007–2009): Nasty Little Beasts (2007); Gruesome Grown Ups (2007); The "Me!" Monsters (2007); Freaks of Nature (2007); Terror Time Toys (2008); Blubbers and Sickers (2008); The Gnaughty Gnomes of "NO!" (2008); Superzeroes (2008); A Grizzly Dozen (2009)
- Author: Jamie Rix
- Illustrator: Bobbie Spargo, Ross Collins, Steven Pattison
- Cover artist: Bobbie Spargo, Ross Collins, Honeycomb Animation, Sue Heap, Steven Pattison
- Country: United Kingdom
- Language: English
- Genre: Children's horror, black comedy
- Publisher: André Deutsch, Orion, Scholastic UK, Puffin Books, Hatchette, Hodder
- Media type: Print (hardback & paperback), Audiobook (cassette, CD & MP3), E-book
- No. of books: 13

The first story Rix ever created was The Spaghetti Man, after using this new cautionary tale as a white lie to his first son. It was about a little boy who refused to behave at the kitchen table and is kidnapped by an invisible force, that takes him to a factory to turn him into lasagne. Rix took note of how the lie had made his four-year-old eat every meal without hesitations, which would inspire a series that could scare children into behaving themselves. The story of the Spaghetti Man would be included in the franchise debut's Grizzly Tales for Gruesome Kids, which was published in 1990 by André Deutsch's eponymous publishing house. Its popularity led to three sequels: Ghostly Tales for Ghastly Kids (1992), Fearsome Tales for Fiendish Kids (1996), and More Grizzly Tales for Gruesome Kids (2001); the latter book was released as the first cartoon aired on CITV. Possibly due to the franchise gaining popularity, the first four books have been re-released numerous times amongst Puffin and Orion. A variety of illustrators designed the front covers, but the success of the CITV cartoon led to the front covers being redesigned by Honeycomb Productions to look like screencaps of the cartoon characters. After an unspecified number of years, the books went out of print.

Six years later, Rix created a new series for the franchise, now named Grizzly Tales: Cautionary Tales for Lovers of Squeam!; eight books were published between 2007 and 2008, the ninth a compilation full of 12 previously published stories from the first and second in the brand. This series borrowed heavily from the CITV cartoon's format by imitating its framing device style of a character telling the stories to the audience, whereas the previous book series was only a collection of short stories. This new character was The Night Night Porter, a creepy owner of a hotel (named The Hot Hell Darkness) that used vague anecdotes and proverbs to show the reader how they would relate to the stories he was about to tell, and would open his check-in book where the stories have been placed. After telling the stories, he would punish the misbehaving kids to spend eternity in one of his hotel rooms.

=== Recurring features ===
Locations of stories varied. Some took place in fictionalised versions of English towns (e.g. Colchester) and others did not (Saucy by Sea). Not all took place in the country of the franchise's origin: "It's Only a Game, Sport!" was set in Australia, for example. "The Chipper Chums Go Scrumping" is a pastiche of the works of Enid Blyton and is set in the Kentish countryside in 1952.

Naming conventions highlighted the humour. The Independent on Sunday pointed out, "Jamie Rix’s splendidly nasty short stories can be genuinely scary, but as the protagonists are obnoxious brats with names like Peregrine and Tristram, you may find yourself cheering as they meet their sticky ends." Some of the characters' surnames implied their roles in the story (Mr and Mrs Frightfully-Busy were workaholics, Johnny Bullneck is an aggressive school bully, and Serena Slurp is greedy) whereas the more ridiculous the family name is, the more unpleasant they are in the story: Fedora Funkelfink the con artist; and the upper-middle-class Crumpdump family, who trophy hunt to impress their spoilt children. "Knock Down Ginger", meanwhile, is set in a fictional town called Nimby, a notorious home for middle-class snobs. Some of the punishments that the horrible characters have are based on puns: loud-mouthed Dolores from "Silence is Golden" is taken to an alchemist and is turned into a gold statue; "Kiss and Make Up" was a double meaning title about a girl who used make up to look prettier so that she could have her first kiss with a handsome boy in her school. Other titles are pop-culture references ("Fatal Attraction", "The Big Sleep", "The Barber of Civil", "Monty's Python", etc.).

Story issues and morals were relatable to the reader (particularly the parents that would be reading to their children), such as television addiction, sibling rivalry, trying to fit in with their friends, personal hygiene, refusing to eat their dinner, punctuality, but others are about theft and deforestation, as well as an implied anti hunting message in "An Elephant Never Forgets". Supernatural characters varied from witch doctors (Doctor Moribundus, The Barber of Civil), poltergeists (The Spaghetti Man), to snake-oil salesmen. There were also fairies, talking animals, aliens, inanimate objects coming to life (such as drawings), and witches, as well as cursed objects, and absurd occurrences (such as piglets travelling across the countryside disguised as a man); other villains, like Farmer Tregowan, were regular people with extremely violent methods of punishment.

Children could be shapeshifted, eaten alive, kidnapped, or turned into food. Due to many of the parents' child neglect and lack of discipline, many of the outcomes of their children's stories do not appear to affect their lives. Some of the workaholic parents are too busy to notice that their child has either been maimed or has disappeared and others are implied to be such insignificance in their children's lives that they do not appear as characters in the story. Meanwhile, happy (or bittersweet) endings were about the character learning from their bad behaviour and turning their lives around before things got worse.

=== Book list ===
No.	Title	Date of publication	No. of pages	Publisher	Notes	Original ISBN	Other ISBN	Ref.
1	Grizzly Tales for Gruesome Kids	17 May 1990	112	André Deutsch Limited	Out of print by 2010	ISBN 9780233985312	ISBN 9780140345728 (1992); ISBN 978-0439014465 (2000)	
2	Ghostly Tales for Ghastly Kids	14 February 1992	144	André Deutsch Limited	Out of print by 2010	ISBN 9780590540049	ISBN 9780590132428 (1995); ISBN 9780439014458 (2000)	
3	Fearsome Tales for Fiendish Kids	8 April 1996	224	Hodder Children's Books	Out of print by 2010	ISBN 978-0340667354	ISBN 978-0340640951	
4	More Grizzly Tales for Gruesome Kids	19 January 2001	304	Scholastic	Out of print by 2010	ISBN 9780439998185	n/a	
5	Nasty Little Beasts	5 April 2007	128	Orion Children's Books		ISBN 978-1842555491	n/a	(Note: Translated into Swedish by Lena Ollmark in 2008)
6	Gruesome Grown Ups	5 April 2007	128	Orion Children's Books		ISBN 978-1842555507	n/a	
7	The "Me!" Monsters	5 July 2007	128	Orion Children's Books		ISBN 978-1842555514	n/a	
8	Freaks of Nature	5 July 2007	128	Orion Children's Books		ISBN 978-1842555521	n/a	
9	Terror Time Toys	7 February 2008	128	Orion Children's Books		ISBN 978-1842555538	n/a	
10	Blubbers and Sickers	7 February 2008	128	Orion Children's Books		ISBN 978-1842555545	n/a	
11	The Gnaughty Gnomes of "NO!"	1 July 2008	128	Orion Children's Books		ISBN 978-1842556474	n/a	
12	Superzeroes	1 July 2008	128	Orion Children's Books		ISBN 978-1842556481	n/a	
13	A Grizzly Dozen	4 June 2009	256	Orion Children's Books		ISBN 978-1444000122	n/a	

== Television series ==
Between 2000 and 2012, two animated adaptations were made for CITV and NickToons. Both were produced and animated by Honeycomb Animation as well as Rix's own television company Elephant (later renamed Little Brother). Producing partner Nigel Planer performed in the cartoons as the narrator of the stories during each episodes' framing devices. The first animated adaptation aired on CITV between January 2000 and October 2006, and the second aired on Nicktoons between May 2011 and November 2012.

== Merchandise ==
Kindle versions of the first four books were briefly available to buy in 2011.

Nigel Planer was the narrator for this series and played Uncle Grizzly. He also narrated Fearsome Tales for Fiendish Kids on audiobook. Bill Wallis narrated More Grizzly Tales for Gruesome Kids, and Grizzly Tales for Gruesome Kids and Ghostly Tales for Ghastly Kids were both read by Andrew Sachs. Orion Audiobooks have also released full CD recordings of the books, read by Rupert Degas. Audio Go have re-released the original Grizzly Tales for Gruesome Kids audiobook on CD and download.

== Reception ==
The franchise received a positive reaction from critics, and audiences of many ages. The second cartoon programme frequently appeared on audience-rated "favourite programme" lists on Nickelodeon. A reporter for The Sunday Times noted "I played all five [audiobook adaptations] to my own junior jury aged 12, 7 and 5. They sat spellbound for 75 minutes, a rare event." Books for Your Children predicted that the series would be entertaining for everyone: "An excellent book of stories for all but the most timid ... the accumulation of grimness is also part of the effect, so older children can enjoy this collection by themselves and adults can have a marvellous time reading them to younger ones", whereas The Evening Standard encouraged it: "It may be a children's story, but many a modern-day trendy parent could watch and learn." The School Librarian added: "Jamie Rix tells us that bad ghosts always stay that way but bad children can improve, which is reassuring because his stories are full of unpleasant children."

Honeycomb producer Susan Bor explained: "What really appealed to me about adapting these wonderful stories for TV was that they were new and fresh, there was nothing out there like it and I particularly wanted the design and look of the series to have that originality." When the CITV cartoon debuted, Carol McDaid of The Observer referred to it as "a quirky new animated series". Reviews noted a connection between the franchise and other respected children's media: "This beautifully conceived and executed series follows in the centuries-old Grimm tradition of sadistic fairy-tale fantasy," wrote Victor Lewis-Smith in The Evening Standard, "and there's something reminiscent of Heinrich Hoffman's Shockheaded Peter about the fiendishly cruel (yet satisfyingly appropriate) fates that befall badly behaved children..." The Daily Telegraph compared the series to Roald Dahl, William Browne, and Hilaire Belloc, a possible reference to Belloc's poetry book Cautionary Tales for Children.

Stories from the books were read by Nigel Planer on radio throughout the 1990s. From 1990, the show appeared on BBC Radio 5, and in 1994, it appeared on BBC Radio 4.

== Awards and nominations ==
Both the books and the two television adaptations have received awards and nominations for their work.

=== Books ===
Year	Award	Category	Nominee	Result	Ref
1990	Nestlé Smarties Book Prize	Fiction, Age 9-11	Grizzly Tales for Gruesome Kids	Won	

== List of published short stories ==
Key
N/A	Denounces information needed but is not included yet
—	Denounces information that did not happen

=== Grizzly Tales for Gruesome Kids (1990) ===
No.	Title	Theme(s)	Cartoon Episode			
No.	Title	Theme(s)	Episode Name	Series	Episode number	Air date
1	The New Nanny	Spite, and telling lies	"The New Nanny"	1	01	4 January 2000
Tristram and Candy Frightfully-Busy frequently bully and humiliate their nanny, and accuse her of abusing them to their parents. When the nanny is fired by Mr Frightfully-Busy, Mrs Frightfully-Busy decides to hire a new one from an animal nanny agency.
2	The One-Tailed, Two-Footed, Three-Bellied, Four-Headed, Five-Fingered, Six-Chinned, Seven-Winged, Eight-Eyed, Nine-Nosed, Ten-Toothed Monster	Prejudice	—	—	—	—
Four centuries ago, an Indian village was terrorised by a large creature, known for kidnapping anyone who is still out at night. A tall farmer's son who is terrible at counting is the creature's next victim.
3	The Spaghetti Man	Spite, Parental abuse by children	"The Spaghetti Man"	1	02	11 January 2000
An invisible, spaghetti-smelling force invites itself into the home of Timothy King, an aggressive child who violently refuses to eat whatever dinner his mother places in front of him. Meanwhile, an old, seemingly-abandoned food factory in Italy only comes to life in the dead of night once a year, but no one knows what happens inside.
4	The Princess's Clothes	Greed, spoilt children	"The Princess's Clothes"	1	07	14 February 2000
Felicity is a daddy's girl, much to her mother's annoyance, and is allowed to do and wear whatever she wants, but tensions arise when her mother considers buying "horrible" clothes from the mysterious Miss Shears.
5	The Black Knight	Greed and lust for power	—	—	—	—
King Basil of Ruritania dies but with no heirs, the government advertises the available position. In a neighbouring country, its prince—nicknamed The Black Knight—plans to invade and take over the monarchy.
6	Glued to the Telly	television addiction, laziness	"Glued to the Telly"	2	02	23 October 2000
Herbert is allowed to eat as many cheese and onion crisps, because he wants and watches television all day, never leaving going to school as a result. A television malfunction sucks him inside and he has to try and escape before he turns into a crisp.
7	The Barber of Civil	Rudeness and manners	"The Barber of Civil"	1	09	28 February 2000
The town of Saucy by Sea is notorious for having the worst behaved children in the world, but the reputation is turning around, thanks to the town's new barber who offers free haircuts to the rudest of the schools, which change these children into completely different (but politer) people. Peregrine and Tania are his next customers.
8	The Man With a Chip on His Shoulder	Annoyance	—	—	—	—
A paragraph-long story about a man frustrated about a chip growing out of his body.
9	The Giant Who Grew Too Big For His Boots	Hubris	"The Giant Who Grew Too Big For His Boots"	2	07	13 November 2000
In a Welsh cottage lives Hugh, a selfish, lisping giant who keeps growing. The more he grows, the greedier he becomes and the wetter the world gets.
10	The Wooden Hill	Facing fears	"The Wooden Hill"	1	05	31 January 2000
Jack wants his mother to read him a story, but the book is upstairs, at the top of the staircase in the dark corridor.
11	The Litter Bug	Littering	"The Litter Bug"	2	10	27 November 2000
The bin was such a successful invention, rats have become extinct and the streets are full of waste mountains. Bunty is a greedy girl who dumps her rubbish anywhere to the point of the mountains being too large for anyone else to leave their houses. She becomes the government's most wanted criminal.
12	Goblin Mountain	Vandalism	"Goblin Mountain"	4	08	30 April 2004
Joseph has a habit of ripping books apart and throwing them out of the window. When there are no books left in the house, he is sent to sleep in the cold, dark attic where he finds a book about goblins.
13	Sweets	Spitefulness	"Sweets"	1	12	20 March 2000
Thomas Rachet causes trouble in supermarkets, embarrassing his submissive mother, because he wants sweets. After a terrible shopping day, Thomas runs away and finds himself in a sweet shop with an old shopkeeper and his creepy mannequins.
14	The Top Hat	Selfishness, pettiness	"The Top Hat"	4	13	21 May 2004
When Benjamin learnt how to walk, he found a top hat that his uncle had given to his parents as a birthday gift. After it breaks from its age years later, Benjamin hopes that his sixth birthday will grant him good fortune, but he is furious when his parents admit that they were unable to find any shops that sell top hats, so he decides to ruin his birthday party as revenge.
15	The Childhood Snatcher	Youth, vicariousness, growing up too fast	"The Childhood Snatcher"	2	06	23 October 2000
Desperate to become famous, Amos marries and has a child, hoping that she will become the youngest genius in the world. However, creating a child genius out of a toddler alerts a supernatural old man, who visits her every year to help himself to her youth by plucking a hair from her head.

=== Ghostly Tales for Ghastly Kids (1992) ===
No.	Title	Theme	Cartoon Episode			
No.	Title	Theme	Episode Name	Series	Episode number	Air date
1	Grandmother's Footsteps	Ghost stories	"Grandmother's Footsteps"	1	03	18 January 2000
A little boy staying overnight at his grandmother's house is spooked by a silohuette outside his bedroom window. The grandmother decides to calm him down by telling him a ghost story which conveniently relates to the little boy's life.
2	Burgers	Deforestation	"Burgerskip"	1	08	21 February 2000
Seamus O'Burger, the CEO of the successful fast food restaurant, Burgerskip, plans to expand his empire by clearing the Amazon rainforest, but his tour guide begs him to reconsider because of a tree shrine dedicated to the indigenous Amazonians' deity that is in the bulldozing path.
3	Tag	Envy, Theft	"Tag"	2	09	13 November 2000
Terry Blotch becomes a kleptomaniac after becoming jealous of a classmate's new popularity. Troubles begin when he steals "A. Phantom"'s PE kit from the school cloakroom.
4	The Locked Door	Nosiness	"The Locked Door"	3	03	24 December 2002
Somewhere in the world is a house with a haunted room that has been locked for 75 years. One day, a deaf couple from New Zealand called Matt and Jodie purchase the house and celebrate the birth of their daughter Rosie, who grows up fascinated by the locked door.
5	A Tangled Web	Animal cruelty, table manners,	"A Tangled Web"	1	06	7 February 2000
Nigel is obsessed with hunting spiders and torturing them in numerous ways. When a pregnant spider named Ariadnae tries to find a new home in his bedroom, he burns her alive, but the ghosts of her children are born out of her corpse and are ready for revenge.
6	The Well	Procrastination	—	—	—	—
Outside the Wellsdeep cottage in Devon, there is a well. Mrs Halley begs her husband to cover it up before their two inquisitive-fingered grandsons arrive. After telling her that he will do it later numerous times, Mr Halley is woken up by invisible forces touching him and laughter from outside.
7	An Elephant Never Forgets	Greed, spoilt children	"An Elephant Never Forgets"	2	05	4 December 2000
The spoilt children of the Crumpdump family called Belinda and Percy demand their parents for an elephant so their father compromises by having one killed and its foot turned into an umbrella stand, which they discover has magical powers.
8	School Dinners	Trauma	—	—	—	—
An old man recounts the terrible memories he had from school lunchtimes, from the strict school dinner lady, to the actions of Elgin – a boy he used to sit next to, with a disturbing obsession with school dinners – and how it has impacted his relationship with meals.
9	The Big Sleep	Between reality and fiction	—	—	—	—
A short story about a father putting his son to bed as the son wonders whether if someone can tell whether they are still in a dream.
10	Bogman	Laziness and excuses	"Bogman"	4	05	16 April 2004
Helen enjoys going to the toilet so that she can escape doing chores. One morning, her mother loses her temper and threatens her to wash the dishes, otherwise The Bogman will come for her.
11	The Broken-Down Cottage	Pranks	"The Broken-Down Cottage"	2	12	30 October 2000
Two boys called Augustus and Arthur who have run away from their homes live together in an abandoned cottage. To pass the time, they decide to prank call all the emergency services.
12	Guilt Ghost	Guilt, murder	—	—	—	—
A man visited a bar and got into a fight with another customer, who fell to their death. In fear and shock, the man runs away to start a new life, but his guilt of manslaughter personifies into a shapeshifting poltergeist, only he can see and communicate with, that refuses to disappear unless he confesses to the police.
13	A Lesson From History	Laziness and ignorance	"The History Lesson"	1	11	13 March 2000
Elisa McGregor is to take a history exam in school but she never studied and loathes the lesson. As she silently panics, watching the rest of the exam hall race through their exam sheets, she is visited by the ghost of a student who died in a school fire 100 years ago.
14	The Ghost of Christmas Turkeys Past	Gluttony and changing one's ways	—	—	—	—
Jack is a huge fan of turkey meals. His parents are tired of them, so his father waits on a neighbour's roof during the late evening of Christmas Eve for Father Christmas to help them stop Jack's eating taste. The magic of Christmas creates a giant, one-legged, talking turkey, who visits Jack and takes him on a journey.
15	Rogues Gallery: The Seven Most-Wanted Ghosts in Britain	—	—	—	—	—
A short fact sheet about seven ghosts: Old Hollow Legs, Nostalgic Nora, Transparent Tony, The Headless Coachman, The Bemuda Triangle, Henry Fink's smelly remains, and Smudger.

=== Fearsome Tales for Fiendish Kids (1996) ===
No.	Title	Theme	Cartoon Episode			
No.	Title	Theme	Episode Name	Series	Episode number	Air date
1	The Cat Burglar	Dishonesty	"Cat Burglar"	2	03	6 November 2000
Fedora Funklefink is a notorious con and forgery artist at her school who preys on desperate students. One day, she finds a poster for a missing cat with a £10 reward and uses her conning ways to try and trick the Tearful family, but the cat owner's mother is not easy to fool.
2	Mr Peeler's Butterflies	Sleep hygiene	"Mr Peeler's Butterflies"	2	04	6 November 2000
Alexander refuses to go to bed, wanting to never sleep again, and is visited by Mr Peeler, a character from a nursery rhyme who steals sleep from children who hate going to bed early.
3	Fat Boy with a Trumpet	Bullying	"Fat Boy with a Trumpet"	2	11	27 November 2000
School bully Johnny Bullneck and his malicious gang set upon the new bespectacled student with a trumpet case.
4	The Chipper Chums Go Scrumping	Theft	"The Chipper Chums Go Scrumping"	1	10	6 March 2000
Set in 1952 and in the style of the children books of Enid Blyton, Algie is visiting his aunt and uncle in Kent for the summer holidays with his dog Stinker and his best friend Col. They go on a picnic in the countryside with three of the neighbourhood kids (Sam, Ginger, and his sister Alice) and search for an adventure, later deciding to scrump from a nearby apple orchard but they are soon caught by its owner, an angry cider making farmer armed with a shotgun.
5	Prince Noman	Snobbery	"Prince Noman"	2	08	20 November 2000
A frail, doddery king forgets his reading glasses at his newborn son's naming ceremony and misreads his speech sheet, naming his son Noman instead of Norman. The mistake causes the newborn baby's body to go invisible.
6	Death By Chocolate	Gluttony, blackmail	"Death By Chocolate"	1	04	4 January 2000
A chocolate factory momentarily ceases production after a fly infiltrates the production line. The contaminated chocolate bunny is bought by the mother of Serena Slurp, a greedy chocoholic who bullies Eli, her sister. When Serena catches Eli accidentally breaking a fly swatter, Eli agrees to become Serena's slave in exchange for not being snitched on to mother.
7	Well 'Ard Willard	Lies and peer pressure	"Well 'Ard Willard"	2	13	4 December 2000
At home, Willard is a science enthusiast, but at school, he is known as a popular globetrotter. He improvises far-fetched anecdotes outside of the classroom and the younger students envy his "exploits" but when Willard claims that he stole the sun and has it hidden in his house, an unconvinced girl in the audience dares him to prove it.
8	Athlete's Foot	Arrogance	"Athlete's Foot"	4	10	7 May 2004
Anthony St. John Smythe is the handsome, charming and talented 400m runner who flaunts his success at Ollie, a clumsy boy who is always falling over the finishing line in last place. Ollie grabs the attention of an old man, who gives him magic trainers that make him win every race in exchange for friendship.
9	The Matchstick Girl	Exploitation	—	—	—	—
In this short story set in Victorian Britain, Polly Peach is a girl from a poor family who sells matchboxes for twopence, until the store owner cuts her pay to a penny.
10	Simon Sulk	Spoilt children	"Simon Sulk"	3	04	30 December 2002
There is an Icelandic legend about shapeshifting trolls that has terrified the country for over five centuries. Meanwhile, in present-day Britain, Simon gets in a sulk by throwing tantrums when he does not get his own way and is furious when his parents want to relocate to Devon, so he locks his door all night.
11	The Dumb Clucks	Hoaxes, gullible	"The Dumb Klutzes"	6	08	17 October 2007
A cowboy arrives in The Cluck family's village of Dork, claiming to be the Son of God, and the townspeople believe every word he says.
12	Doctor Moribundus	Malingering	"Doctor Moribundus"	1	13	27 March 2000
Lorelei Lee frequently pretends to be ill so that she can never go back to school. After momentarily being caught, a doctor recommends Dr Moribundus to her oblivious parents.
13	The Stick Men	child neglect, escapism	"The Stick Men"	4	11	7 May 2004
The closest affection Chico gets is from the pictures he draws on his bedroom wall, which his snobbish, workaholic parents quickly wash off as they call him a nuisance. One day, Chico's drawings come to life and show him their world.
14	Little Fingers	Habits	"Little Fingers"	3	12	25 February 2003
Daffyd Thomas used to suck his thumb but his thumb barely survived those days, now looking shrivelled and nail-less. Due to the lack of "affection", the thumb has a life of its own, making Daffyd fail to keep his hands to himself. His parents decide to go on holiday and leave him with his grandmother, which makes his hands fidget towards the telephone.
15	Bessy O'Messy	Laziness	"Bessy O'Messy"	4	07	23 April 2004
Bessy is both wasteful and forgetful, who has a mountain of dirty clothes and garbage in her room. When her mother orders her to clean it by herself, Bessy falls in the pile and lands in an alternate universe where messy leprechauns live.
16	Jack in a Box	Attention-seeking	"Jack in a Box"	2	01	20 November 2000
Jack Delaunay de Havilland De Trop precociously interrupts conversations and frustrates his parents, Lord and Lady Delaunay de Havilland De Trop. At his little sister's birthday party, in walks their hired children's entertainer, Mr Frankenstein, a ventriloquist.

=== More Grizzly Tales For Gruesome Kids (2001) ===
No.	Title	Theme	Cartoon Episode			
No.	Title	Theme	Episode Name	Series	Episode number	Air date
1	Knock Down Ginger	Elder abuse	"Knock Down Ginger"	3	02	17 December 2002
In the snobbish town of Nimby, the residents resent Mr Thrips, an entomologist, who lives on Nimby's "millionaire's row" in a house full of rescued insects. Ginger Pie is a boy who lives opposite to Thrips and is encouraged by his mother to scare their neighbour out of town, which he attempts with his friend Milo (along with Milo's sister Eliza) by playing Knock Down Ginger.
2	The Upset Stomach	Animal abuse	"The Upset Stomach"	3	01	10 December 2002
The greedy Ethel Turnip discovers a newspaper advert about a farm that breeds animal stomachs so she orders her parents to buy one in time for Christmas, but she regrets this decision almost immediately after the stomach is delivered.
3	The Gas Man Cometh	Prank call	"The Gas Man Cometh"	4	04	16 April 2004
Stefan, a frequent prank caller, wants to do more impressions, such as Queen Elizabeth II, and decides to take a gas tank full of helium from a "gas man".
4	The Urban Fox	Hunting	"The Urban Fox"	3	05	7 January 2003
An upper-middle-class couple arrive in Mr and Mrs Smith's council estate and decide to go fox hunting when they see the Smiths' pet fox, Elvis, in the kitchen. Mr and Mrs Smith's daughter Parker and Elvis scramble to create a plan to stop the event, through Elvis' cunning ways.
5	Spoilsport	Spite	"Spoilsport"	3	07	21 January 2003
Girl Pinchgut enjoyed destroying children's imaginations, but when she tells her brother the Tooth Fairy is a tall tale, the Tooth Fairy plans her revenge.
6	Dirty Bertie	Personal hygiene	"Dirty Bertie"	3	10	11 February 2003
Bertie's parents are ashamed their son refuses to keep himself clean and hope that he will change his mind one day so other people will want to interact with him, but an alien that has crash-landed in their garden will prove someone in the universe is not bothered by Bertie's filthiness.
7	The People Potter	Responsibility	"The People Potter"	4	03	16 April 2004
Greta Gawky is a tall girl at 2 m (6.6 ft) and very clumsy. After eventually managing to not break anything in her house for a while, her parents buy a porcelain figure from an ancient antique shop, which is based on the legend of The People Potter.
8	It's Only a Game, Sport!	Sore loser	"It's Only a Game, Sport!"	4	01	2 April 2004
Shane and Sheila were once the most famous athletes in Australian history, but their children are not as lucky. Their daughter, Kitty, does not mind but their son, Bruce, is a failure at every sport he touches, and has become a sore loser as a result.
9	Fast Food	Eating too much food	—	—	—	—
A short story about an ambulance failing to rescue a patient in time.
10	Sock Shock	Missing things	—	—	—	—
Nick never wears shoes and always walks around in his socks. When the washing machine malfunctions, he discovers that one of his precious socks have disappeared, so he sets out to look for them.
11	Revenge of the Bogeyman	Nose-picking	"Revenge of the Bogeyman"	4	01	2 April 2004
Dee discovers The Bogeyman living inside her nose, who wants her to stop picking.
12	Crocodile Tears	Telling lies	"Crocodile Tears"	3	11	18 February 2003
Gwendolyn Howling pretends to be a cry-baby so that she can get anything she wants. Her parents, who are both nervous wrecks, believe everything.
13	The Pie Man	Childish habits	"The Pie Man"	3	08	28 January 2003
Donald is a thumb sucker and has been since the day he was born. A midwife warns that there is a man who uses sucked thumbs to hold up the pastries of his pies, so Donald's parents become determined to stop him from sucking his thumbs, which backfires when they buy him a dummy.
14	Bunny Boy	Fussy eater	"Bunny Boy"	4	06	23 April 2004
Bill refuses to eat his vegetables and tries any absurd method he can think of to get rid of it.
15	Spit	Spitting when talking to someone	—	—	—	—
A short story about a boy spitting.
16	Superstitious Nonsense	Lie, Superstition	"Superstitious Nonsense"	4	09	30 April 2004
Pylon Gaslamp is a paranoid girl who invents superstitions, but when her parents disbelieve her, she begins her revenge by inventing several so she can get out of being bossed by her parents, and her parents believe every single lie.
17	Head in the Clouds	Focus	"Head in the Clouds"	3	09	4 February 2003
Brian is always daydreaming and one afternoon, it causes his head to snap off.
18	When The Bed Bugs Bite	Insects	"When the Bed Bugs Bite"	3	06	14 January 2003
Hannibal loves to bite people but when his antics cause his parents to receive an expensive bill, they tell him that they hope bed bugs return the favour someday.
19	The Decomposition of Delia Deathabridge	Arrogance and being condescending	"The Decomposition of Delia Deathabridge"	4	14	21 May 2004
Delia is the daughter of university professors, so she believes she has a right to never study. One day, a substitute English teacher forces her to write an essay and Delia discovers her writing comes to life.
20	The Grass Monkey	Relationships and pride in one's appearance	"The Grass Monkey"	4	12	14 May 2004
Spike has an after-school job in a hairdresser's and falls in love with Esmerelda, a snooty, aspiring model. In order to get out of trouble with her parents, she asks Spike to shoplift special shampoo to prove his love for her.

=== Nasty Little Beasts (April 2007) ===
No.	Title	Theme	Cartoon Episode			
No.	Title	Theme	Episode Name	Series	Episode number	Air date
1	The Grub A Blub Blub	Laziness	"The Grub A Blub Blub"	5	05	31 March 2006
Savannah Slumberson prefers living in her bedroom and is furious when her active parents adamantly decide to go on a camping holiday at resort miles away from their city. While she is sleeping in the tent, a group of grubs used a web-like coating to turn her into a Grub A Blub Blub. While her parents are doing their daily exercise, Savannah is trapped in an animal centre.
2	Monty's Python	Sibling rivalry, animal abuse	"Monty's Python"	5	04	30 March 2006
Monty tortures his sister Mayflower with traumatising pranks and decides to take them to the next level by buying a python (he names "SisterEater") to terrorise her more. But when Mayflower warns her brother about his pet biting his groin off, he is terrified of SisterEater. The large python takes him down the sewers where he is taught a lesson while his sister flushed the toilet to shut him up.
3	The Lobster's Scream	Spoilt children	"The Lobster's Scream"	6	09	17 October 2006
Shannon Shellfish is empowered when her parents follow her demands but when they ask her what she wants, she is stunned, and soon becomes obsessed with a restaurant owner's lobster costume. After being insulted and cooked alive, a group of enraged lobsters pick her up and put her into a pot of boiling water in the kitchen of the restaurant.
4	Wolf Child	Envy, kidnapping, sibling rivalry and age regression.	"Wolf Child"	5	06	3 April 2006
Garth MacQueen tries to get his baby sister Moira kidnapped when his family hears about wolves terrorising their neighbourhood because of their ancestor killing one member of the pack. After the kidnapping, many people believe that he is either eaten or raised as a wolf pup. But others fear that Garth might end his family's bloodline permanently.
5	The Fruit Bat	Fussy eater and laziness	"The Fruit Bat"	5	03	29 March 2006
Cherie Stone tells her parents she refuses to eat fruit when they force her to do so. When she hears a hungry fruit bat following her, she is reluctant to go to school. That night, the same fruit bat goes into her bedroom and eats both the tangerine as well as the plum in her pyjama pocket. The next morning, Cherie is turned into a fruit bat due to an accidental bite to her chest.
6	The Clothes Pigs	Laziness, greed	"The Clothes Pigs"	6	03	20 September 2006
In the city, a boy named Trueman "Truffle" Snuffle makes his parents do everything for him. In a nearby farmland, piglets starve as their greedy family members push them out of the way to get a bigger helping in the trough. Despite his parents warning about the Clothes Pigs, Truffle is eaten alive by them, only to leave his clothes behind in his bedroom.

=== Gruesome Grown Ups (April 2007) ===
No.	Title	Theme	Cartoon Episode			
No.	Title	Theme	Episode Name	Series	Episode number	Air date
1	Jamie's School Dinners	Fussy eater	"Jamie's School Dinners"	6	01	18 September 2006
A boy named Jamie is obsessed with junk food and is forced to go on a diet. When a new dinner lady named Ambrosine visits the school, she makes his favourite meals out of processed meat which made him obese and confused. Later that night, he is taken to her island due to a radio receiver in his chocolate pizza where she fattens him up, killing him instantly. She turns him into chicken nuggets and never goes back to Jamie's neighbourhood, revealing herself as a high priestess or a witch.
2	Silence Is Golden	Manners and rudeness	"Silence is Golden"	5	10	7 April 2006
A girl named Dolores Bellicose enjoyed shouting because it made her the most heard person in her school. The school librarians are not impressed and plan to teach her a lesson by hiring an alchemist who can turn her into a gold statue. When they try to load her onto a ship, a group of pirates drop Dolores into the ocean while the silence project becomes a big success.
3	The Old Tailor of Pelting Moor	Obsession with one's appearance	"The Old Tailor of Pelting Moor"	6	10	18 October 2006
A boy named Jumbo Ferrari wants a new "life suit" when he meets the Old Tailor of Pelting Moor in his bedroom closet. When he discovers that his skin has been swapped with him, the tailor tells him that pride can easily take over one's life if they are obsessed with their looks. Once the tailor vanished in a bright light, Jumbo walks around with wrinkles and torn up clothing every day, much to his dismay.
4	Her Majesty's Moley	Animal abuse	"Her Majesty's Moley"	5	11	10 April 2006
A girl called Mattie (or Millie) enjoys torturing/killing moles with her father. But when he dies of gangrene due to a severe injury to his foot, she is sent to prison for her crimes after obtaining a mole's paw which was turned into a keyring. After a group of moles use a magic spell to cover Mattie in moleskin, she crawls around beneath the floor and smashes lamps in the ceiling to hide her appearance from the world. Meanwhile, the Queen is shaving moleskin off of her chin within the bathroom.
5	The Soul Stealer	Blackmail, abuse of power	"The Soul Stealer"	5	13	12 April 2006
A girl called Poppy is given a new mobile phone with a camera and uses it to blackmail people around her, including her parents and students from school. When she chases Anna through a store in town, her father warns Poppy about the Soul Stealer if she continues her pranks. After she comes home, she sees herself in each photograph and is literally sealed into them for all eternity. Thanks to the Soul Stealer, justice is finally served.
6	Nobby's Nightmare	Relationships	"Nobby's Nightmare"	6	07	16 October 2006
A boy named Nobby finds it hard to distinguish whether he is in a dream or not, but Sophie really is the girl of his dreams. When her parents meet Nobby's parents who are naturists, she reveals herself as an alien from another planet. However, Nobby discovers that Sophie is in love with another boy and is eaten by her, so that she can hide the relationship from him.

=== The "Me!" Monsters (July 2007) ===
No.	Title	Theme	Cartoon Episode			
No.	Title	Theme	Episode Name	Series	Episode number	Air date
1	The Apostrophic Expositor	Rudeness	"The Apostrophic Expositor"	8	03	7 September 2011
A chatterbox named B.S. Brogan (or a female version) interrupts peoples conversations by speaking non-stop and insulting the school students or teachers. One day, after getting kicked out, a young man known as the Apostrophic Expositor, who works as an English teacher at school, visits the family home and teaches his student about the importance of punctuation to correct one's sentences.
2	Kiss and Make Up	Insecurity and makeup	"Kiss and Make Up"	5	08	5 April 2006
A girl named Holly Hotlips wants to have her first kiss and is visited by a (literal) two-faced fairy, who gives her advice and some makeup to look prettier. However, her new makeup causes her to become emotionally insecure. But when her face is swapped with the fairy, she is devastated and horrified.
3	The Kingdom of Wax	Lying and stealing.	"Kingdom of Wax"	7	11	9 May 2011
A young boy named Nebuchadnezzar (or Nathaniel) is born to a family of Christians until he steals wax from each sculpture in the museum for different reasons. To keep himself out of trouble, he lies to his parents about the wax until the sculptures get their revenge. But he accidentally burns himself with a torch, causing the Kingdom of Wax to melt to the ground.
4	The Blood Doctor	Pride in one's appearance	"The Blood Doctor"	8	01	5 September 2011
A young girl named Georgina "Georgie" Sutcliffe does everything to win each pageant contest by being cocky. Later, a Haematologist known as the Blood Doctor decides to replace her bad blood with something else that will change her personality. But when another special ingredient is injected into her bloodstream, her punishment for her narcissism comes true.
5	The Ugly Prince	Relationships and revenge	"The Ugly Prince"	7	03	3 May 2011
A boy named Prince Spencer ends up being dumped by Princess Britney after she took off his disguise. When the fairy godmother refused to take part in his vengeful plan, he steals a potion that transforms him into a frog. However, he ends up being sliced in half by a lawn mower and put into a blender.
6	Big Head	Pride and arrogance	"Big Head"	6	11	18 October 2006
A boy named Samuel "Sammy" Slitherall becomes smug when he is picked as a team mascot. As he visits an abandoned shop in town, a medicine specialist named Dr. Chu puts an end to his narcissistic ways by using facial cream and a face wrap, making his head shrink down.

=== Freaks of Nature (July 2007) ===
No.	Title	Theme	Cartoon Episode			
No.	Title	Theme	Episode Name	Series	Episode number	Air date
1	Frank Einstein's Monster	Pyromania	"Frank Einstein's Monster"	8	07	29 October 2012
A boy named Frank Einstein does everything to win a competition so he can strap his creation to a rocket and make it explode. As Frank works on his new invention, his parents receive a surprise visit from the Fire King who says that a firework is the only cure for his Pyromania. However, an hour later, the monster decides to teach Frank about the dangers of explosives by turning the tables. But when he does not get his own way, his victim is burnt alive on a bonfire.
2	Recyclops	Recycling	"Recyclops"	6	02	19 September 2006
A young girl named Scabby gets a surprise visit from a sentient robot named Recyclops, who teaches her how not to waste one's possessions when there is nothing wrong with them. After he reinvents her, she starts to realize that the robot is right while he returns to his duties in other places. Today, he is keeping his one good eye on naughty children who throw new things such as toys, household objects and cutlery away like trash.
3	The Weather Witch	Elderly abuse and not checking the warning signs in cold weather.	"The Weather Witch"	5	07	4 April 2006
A boy named Jack Frost does not understand how horrible cold weather is, especially to the elderly. When he kept ignoring the dangers of frozen lakes and thin ice, he receives not one, but two surprise visits from the Weather Witch. A ghostly woman who was keeping kids safe from icy hazards. But he does not listen to what she says and is turned into a glacial statue before being melted away by the sunlight. Two snowdrops grow out of the ground near the greenhouse after the water gets into their roots.
4	William The Conkerer	Greed, arrogance and destroying nature	"William the Conkerer"	5	09	6 April 2006
A boy named William is determined to be the Conkers king of the school playground so he sneaks out of his house at midnight to destroy every conker tree in the area, angering a hermit who lives in a treehouse. To prevent more conker trees from being damaged, he uses a supernatural conker that sucks his victim into it and eats another person to stay alive. With that, revenge becomes a dish best served and nature is never in danger again.
5	Hear No Weevil, See No Weevil	Obsession with one's size, cheating, ignorance	"Hear No Weevil See No Weevil"	7	04	3 May 2011
A girl named Broccoli Brassica uses a special syringe to make her vegetables grow to a massive size, hoping to beat her opponents by cheating. Despite her parents warning about wolf-sized insects known as Weevils, she is determined to win the competition, but is reduced to an empty corpse when a hungry Weevil literally sucks the flesh and bones out of her body to survive. Once the Weevils return to their home, Mother Nature taught Broccoli how to not force change on the cycle between life and death.
6	Tom Time	Punctuality	"Tom Time"	6	13	19 October 2006
A boy named Tom is never on time for anything in his life and when science discovers that the end of the world is imminent, Tom's mother is determined to make him on time for the evacuation spaceships. When his parents leave him behind due to a heated argument, he does not make it to the vehicle until he is encased in a bubble while Mother Earth is reduced to nothing. One hour later than the rest of the world, Tom's luck and time runs out, sealing his fate.

=== Terror Time Toys (February 2008) ===
No.	Title	Theme	Cartoon Episode			
No.	Title	Theme	Episode Name	Series	Episode number	Air date
1	The Butcher Boy	Greed and attention-seeking	"The Butcher Boy"	5	02	28 March 2006
Gilbert Saint Patrick is obsessed with money and fame and does anything to be the richest boy in his school who gets the most attention. When he ends up stealing Chuck's bike, Grandpa Gideon decides to get revenge on him by turning him into sausages. Once he completed his objective, his grandson gives his friends their new gifts as an act of kindness.
2	The Bugaboo Bear	Mistreatment of toys	"The Bugaboo Bear"	5	01	27 march 2006
A girl named Emily Stiff gets a new teddy bear from the latest popular brand but soon becomes bored with it and starts to vandalise it. When Cutie has had enough of his owner's abusive attitude towards him, he decides to take justice into his own hands. He stuffs Emily with sawdust and takes her to another girl who repeats the same abuse while Cutie sets the other toys free from the torment. Whenever a toy is in serious trouble, Cutie is there to prevent the same mistreatment from happening to it.
3	Why Boys Make Better Burglars	Robbery	"Why Boys Make Better Burglers"	6	04	21 September 2006
The Burglar family welcome a new son named Billy and his father cannot wait to teach him the family's tricks. Due to a robbery gone wrong, Mr and Mrs Burglar teach their young daughter how to be a burglar while Billy is serving time in jail. The story showed that both boys and girls can be burglars wherever they go, which shows that burglary can sometimes become a family affair in any place of the world.
4	Puppet on a String	Laziness	"Puppet on a String"	5	12	11 April 2006
A boy named Calloway prefers to be more of a slacker, rather than help his parents with clothes or dishes. When a clown-like puppet visits him in the middle of the night, his father tells him about the Puppetmaster who visited him since he was young. One day, as Calloway walks to school, he discovers many black strings on his body and is sent to the theatre. The shocking situation makes the theatre close down permanently while he helps his parents.
5	The Death Rattle	Ego and jealousy.	"The Spelling Bee"	7	12	9 May 2011
A girl named Purnellopy Underblanket uses spelling, but she meets an end and she becomes a human hive!
6	eBoy	Computer addiction	"eBoy"	6	06	16 October 2006
A school student named Eric sits by his computer in his bedroom. Displeased by his time on the Internet, his parents explain about the dangers of Cyberspace but their son does not listen to them, much to their frustration. When Eric typed in the name of a website known as "Phantom Postman", he is sent into the world of Cyberspace until a virus attacks his computer. After a long journey through the Interweb, he is finally sent home.

=== Blubbers and Sicksters (February 2008) ===
No.	Title	Theme	Cartoon Episode			
No.	Title	Theme	Episode Name	Series	Episode number	Air date
1	The Piranha Sisters	Gaslighting	"The Piranha Sisters"	6	12	19 October 2006
A girl named Dorothy May Piranha loves pranking her sister, Petey, but these pranks are malicious and warp Petey's common sense, which gets her in trouble with their parents. When Petey's birthday arrives, Dorothy May plans to make the party an unforgettable one, but a skeleton-like spirit warns her that her pranks might go horribly wrong, but she does not listen and is eaten alive by piranhas in the bathtub.
2	The Crystal Eye	Selfishness	"A Grizzly New Year's Tale: The Crystal Eye"	4	15	31 December 2004
A boy named Fick is tired of sharing everything with his twin brother Finn but then the family receives a mirror for Christmas. When the magic mirror reveals a kind and compassionate version of Fick, he tells his polar opposite about how his narcissism and greed can turn a special holiday sour. But when he refuses to listen to a gypsy and his reflection, Fick's fate is sealed when he is turned into a zombie. The good Fick fills the empty hole in his family's life and goes on an exciting shopping trip to New York City in the United States.
3	Cat's Eyes	Abusing the trust of others	"Cat's Eyes"	7	06	4 May 2011
A mean older sister named Cat Clore tries to coerce her siblings into doing her wishes. By doing dangerous stunts, she does everything to be the best of the best, only to discover that her brothers and sisters refuse to do what she said. When a young boy encourages them to stand up to bullies, Cat does not back down and grabs Tiny Tim so she can get revenge. Miraculously, a group of crows manage to save him. But after a stunt went wrong, she falls onto an open road where a steam roller crushes her to death and turns her into another crow.
4	The Hair Fairies	Jealousy and pride	"The Hair Fairies"	8	02	6 September 2011
Fairies visit a boy named Hemp Sock when he envies his sister Moonunit's hair. After cutting it all off, he asks his parents if they like him more than her, their father says that he likes Hemp Sock less which makes him very angry. After destroying his family's possessions by snipping them and smashing them, he is turned into a wooden statue by the Hair Fairies who prevent his vandalism from reaching dangerous levels.
5	The Watermelon Babies	wasting water	"The Watermelon Babies"	6	05	22 September 2006
Two sisters named Kitty and Winnie Camel who live in a country suffering from a severe drought ignore the Hosepipe ban and abuse their power over water for their entertainment. When a plumber, who is in fact a hitman in disguise, comes to the family home, he discovers 2 indigo watermelon seeds in the kitchen sink. When he warns both parents about their daughters wasting more and more water, his prophecy wants true when Kitty and Winnie are turned into watermelons, possibly due to a magic spell. Their dehydrated classmates eat the watermelons and walk away from the house.
6	The Nuclear Wart	nuclear power, sibling rivalry	"The Nuclear Wart"	8	13	2 November 2012
Tom and Jerry are two brothers who despise each other to the point of their negative energy manifesting into an ever-growing wart. After fighting over the smallest of things for a long time, their consciences get the best of them as the Nuclear Wart puts positive energy into the citizens of Mother Earth. Once it consumes the nuclear power and the planet's core, there is nothing left of it, except for a blackish brown shield that conceals the Earth as it floats through the depths of space.

=== The Gnaughty Gnomes of "NO!" (July 2008) ===
No.	Title	Theme	Cartoon Episode			
No.	Title	Theme	Episode Name	Series	Episode number	Air date
1	Tinkerbell	Not eating one's food	"Tinklebell"	7	01	2 May 2011
A schoolboy named Gilbert Sparrow refuses to eat what is on his plate, causing the relationship between him and his parents to become strained. While his mother hires a fairy known as Tinkerbell to fix the problem, he makes a bet by saying that if they refuse to what is on their dish, he wins until the week is up. When Tinklebell visits the family home outside, he gives them some new cutlery. But near the end of the week, Gilbert tells them to eat him. They say no but instantly realise what they have done.
2	The Long Face	Sulking and jealousy	"The Long Face"	7	10	6 May 2011
Green with envy, Petty Gambrel-Fetlock does everything to be a horse rider when she meets an Irish boy named Stewart Piddle who worked as a blacksmith in a stable. But when she keeps on sulking due to not getting everything she wants, the Headless Horseman chooses to operate on her face. When she regains consciousness, her head is horse-like, much to her horror. And later, she returns home while Stewart achieves his childhood dream as an equestrian, but his head falls off when a horse jumps.
3	The Dragon Moth	Ignoring the warning signs	"The Dragon Moth"	7	09	6 May 2011
Josiah Reeks never obeys the warning signs such as not using a broken toilet or running across the road when traffic is moving. One night, he visits a mysterious lighthouse when an old man appears in front of him. Inside the lighthouse was a massive moth-like monster that picks Josiah up by his arms and drops him onto the rocks, killing him almost instantly.
4	Sick To Death	Throwing up, skipping school, absentee parents and tantrums	"Sick To Death"	7	02	2 May 2011
In the early 1950's, a schoolgirl named Victoria Spew vomits indigested food onto the floor so she can get she wanted. Her father worked hard by selling dustpans to people, but her mother insisted on buying a new vacuum cleaner known as the Shark Deluxe. This causes their marriage to become strained. After coming home from school, she is warned about the new invention by a mysterious man. She tried to tell her mother about him and the Shark Deluxe, but has her limbs and vital organs ripped from her whole body.
5	Message in a Bottle	Jobs and self-isolation	"Message in a Bottle"	7	07	5 May 2011
Pottering Partridge is embarrassed by his father's job and isolates himself from his parents and the outside world. To make matters worse, he hides in a boiler room and refuses to go to school which causes his parents to become worried sick. When he climbs onto a tree, he discovers a French man who covers him in a special glue and shoves him into a glass bottle. When both of his parents find him, they set off on a tour around the globe to make money.
6	Lazybones	Laziness	"Lazy Bones"	8	06	10 September 2011
Ida Lydon relaxes herself on the couch, also known as a sofa, by drinking juice and eating pizza. When the doctor and the school principal tell her parents that her heart will not be used to exercise, possibly due to a heart condition, they try to help her get fit but she continuously refuses to do so. While Mr and Mrs Lydon go out to get some groceries, a sentient skeleton from Japan known as the Boneshaker reconnects her bones into the proper position.

=== Superzeroes (July 2008) ===
No.	Title	Theme	Cartoon Episode			
No.	Title	Theme	Episode Name	Series	Episode number	Air date
1	Fatal Attraction	Ego	"Nerves of Steel"	8	04	8 September 2011
When Charlie Chicken lies about what he experienced, everyone believes him except for people who discover his true colours. Desperate for a way out, he does everything to get away from his past, but ends up paying the price when justice finally catches up to him.
2	Little Angel	Dishonesty and blackmail	"Little Angel"	7	08	5 May 2011
A girl named Eliza Toadley blackmails her younger brother, Wycombe, to her parents, Terry and Laura. When a group of gargoyles hear about her false accusations against him in a gothic castle, they decide to help Wycombe give his mean sister her just desserts by turning her into a stone statue. As the family drive off, Eliza has been transformed into a gargoyle herself with a halo on top of her head.
3	The Flat-Pack Kid	Destruction and vandalism	"The Flat Pack Kid"	7	13	10 May 2011
Humpty Egg breaks multiple items in the family home so he can discover the outside world. But when the vandalism spins out of control, a businessman named DIY Dye warns him about the incidents and instantly reduces him to a pile of connectable pieces after he does not heed the final word.
4	The Worm	Playing pranks that are not funny	"The Worm"	8	05	9 September 2011
Eustace Colon enjoys scaring Evie to death by putting worms in his mouth or her bedroom, but his parents do not find his pranks amusing. When Evie discovers a pale blue tapeworm with antenna, she reaches her breaking point by telling her brother to eat it which causes him to turn into a tapeworm himself. As his father tries to bring him into a shop, Eustace is sliced in half by the front door which made a terrified mob run towards the family home. As the citizens tell Evie to open her brother's bedroom window, Mr and Mrs Colon are horrified by their son's disappearance.
5	The Little Flower Girl	Admiration, arrogance	"The Little Flower Girl"	8	10	30 October 2012
In the future, a girl named Petal Stalewater gives people flowers to admire her. But the Central Flower Court and a local gardener are not convinced by her gestures when she steals the last flower on Earth known as the Black Angel. Later, a small doll known as the Little Flower Girl gives her just desserts by turning her into the same flower that Petal stole from the ground.
6	The Rise And Fall of the Evil Guff	Manners and etiquette	"The Rise and Fall of The Evil Guff"	7	05	4 May 2011
A boy named Bart Thumper uses flatulence to get his way after eating a cauliflower. But when he does not get anything he wanted, he makes terrorist-like threats towards people in the world including his own parents, which makes him a danger towards society. As he flew into the O-Zone layer, he is sent into the Stone Age where he decomposes.

=== A Grizzly Dozen (2009) ===
This was a compilation book containing stories from the previous books in the Grizzly Tales: Cautionary Tales for Lovers of Squeam! series.

1. The Grub A Blub Blub
2. Monty's Python
3. The Lobster's Scream
4. Wolf Child
5. The Fruit Bat
6. The Clothes Pigs
7. Jamie's School Dinners
8. Silence Is Golden
9. The Old Tailor of Pelting Moor
10. Her Majesty's Moley
11. The Soul Stealer
12. Nobby's Nightmare

== See also ==
- Struwwelpeter – possible inspiration for the franchise debut
- Cautionary Tales for Children – poetry book that has been compared to the book
- Goosebumps – American speculative book series for children
