= Grizzly Tales for Gruesome Kids (book) =

1990 book of short stories by Jamie Rix

- Cover of the first edition, illustrated by Bobbie Spargo.
- Author: Jamie Rix
- Audio read by: Andrew Sachs (1993)
- Illustrator: Bobbie Spargo
- Cover artist: Bobbie Spargo
- Series: Grizzly Tales for Gruesome Kids
- Release number: 1
- Genre: Children's horror
- Publisher: André Deutsch Limited, etc.
- Publication date: 17 May 1990
- Publication place: United Kingdom
- Media type: Hardback
- Pages: 112 (first edition)
- Awards: Nestle Smarties Book Prize 1990 (Fiction, Age 9–11)
- ISBN: 978-0-23-398531-2 (1st ed.)
- Followed by: Ghostly Tales for Ghastly Kids
- Went out of print in 2009

Grizzly Tales for Gruesome Kids is the debut book by British author Jamie Rix and was the first book in the children's cautionary horror book series Grizzly Tales for Gruesome Kids. It was published on 17 May 1990 by André Deutsch Limited and contains 15 short cautionary tales. These stories featured a monster maths teacher, animal nannies, a barber that specialised in making rude children behave themselves, a giant that cannot stop growing, a magical hat, a magic book, magic scissors, and a sweet shop full of mannequins.

It won the 1990 Nestle Smarties Book Prize for Fiction, Age 9–11. The book went out of print in 2009.

== Synopsis ==
=== The New Nanny ===
The Frightfully-Busy family lives in South London and knew nothing about each other: the parents were workaholics that had no time for their children, Tristram and Candy, who spent every day bullying their nanny, Mrs. Mac, and tell their parents a different story the moment they came home. One day, they claim she had beaten them with their father's expensive golf clubs which gets Mrs. Mac fired, but that would be the moment where troubles began. Mrs. Frightfully-Busy is devastated they have to get rid of an old family friend as she looks through a telephone directory and discovers the Animal Magic agency. 30 minutes after booking, a talking python is on the doorstep wearing an apron and carrying a briefcase, but Mr. and Mrs. Frightfully-Busy have no time for any briefing and left for work immediately after the python's entire 12 metres (39 ft) long body is in the hallway. The python tells Candy and Tristram to treat her as a human nanny, ironically consenting to the children's behaviour and removing any fear they had of snakes. They burn her tail in boiling water, tie her up and dunk her head in the toilet, make her slither over thumbtacks, and leave her in the garden for birds to peck at her. When their parents arrive home at 6 pm, the python slithers out of the house as fast as she can, but when the parents confront the children, Tristram claims the python tried to strangle him.

The next morning, Mrs Frightfully-Busy telephones a complaint to Animal Magic, who promises to send a better nanny. 15 minutes later, the parents rush out of the house and a giant spider crawls in. Tristram takes her to the bathroom and he and his sister splash and pour water over the spider, and then demand she makes a climbing frame in the garden out of her web. She weaves as the children order her to make it bigger until it stretches across two gardens and as high as the chimney. As she slept, the children tie her up in it and poke her with a stick until their parents came home. After their father escorts her out in a wheelbarrow, the children sob that she tied them to the ceiling by their ankles. Mrs Frightfully-Busy telephones another complaint the next morning and goes to work immediately after, leaving enough time for Tristram to wait at the front door with a bat. Seconds later, he smacks an alligator on her head as Candy laughs. When their parents came home, they found a sleeping alligator and no children. The alligator admits she ate them, lays two eggs and leaves. Tristram and Candy hatch out the eggs and immediately confess their abusive behavior as they hug their mother. The door knocks and Mr. Frightfully-Busy finds Mrs. Mac on the doorstep, who was hoping his children had found a new nanny. Mr. Frightfully-Busy admits it had been hard, rehires her and helps with her three suitcases. One was made of snakeskin, one was small and fuzzy, and the other was made of alligator-skin.

=== The One-Tailed, Two-Footed, Three-Bellied, Four-Headed, Five-Fingered, Six-Chinned, Seven-Winged, Eight-Eyed, Nine-Nosed, Ten-Toothed Monster ===
In the Indian village of Jaisalmer, there was once a monster that used to terrorise at sundown. It lived in the nearby caves and every brave knight that attempted to slay it for ₹1,000 (one thousand rupees) was never seen again. Tulsidor was a farmer's son who was the tallest boy in his class, and Mathematics was his worst subject. There would be a Maths exam soon but Tulsidor was unlikely to pass, no matter how many private tutors his parents hire. One night, being distracted by 2+1 and 1+2 made him forget that sunset was over, and the monster charged towards the village looking for food. Tulsidor faints and wakes up in a dark cave, spotting the monster sitting opposite reading, and is caught when he attempts an escape. The monster offers to teach him how to count and uses his many body parts to help Tulsidor with addition. Tulsidor enjoys his free Maths lesson and learns how 2+1 and 1+2 both equal 3, and explains that he hears about the monster kidnapping and eating people and is worried the same would happen to him. The monster is surprised to hear these rumours and replies that he wants friends but all the animals will run away because of his appearance, and he is very clumsy because of his giant feet which constantly destroys houses in the village.

Three days later, Tulsidor returned home unharmed. When he got the highest test grade in the Mathematics exam, his teacher demands to meet the person who taught him. The next day, Tulsidor escorts the monster to his school. The village panics but Tulsidor assures the monster is the new Mathematics teacher with no intention of eating humans. Jaisalmer becomes the birthplace of history's best mathematicians and still is the best place in the world to learn maths 400 years later.

=== The Spaghetti Man ===
Despite being closed and abandoned, once a year, a pasta factory in Venice whirs and chugs through the night. No one had ever been seen leaving and/or visiting and its original owner's whereabouts are unknown, but whenever it comes to life, the front gates open to allow a black car to drive out and back in. Then the gates close and the factory remains unused for another year.

In the United Kingdom lives Timothy King, a boy who throws violent tantrums over every meal his mother gives him. His mother is terrible at discipline and fails to make her son listen to her, whereas her husband is an emotionally distant workaholic and uses army slang that often confuses Timothy and causes him to misbehave more. One morning, Timothy picks up his plate and throws it at the kitchen sink, splattering the Sunday roast against the window. As his mother cries in helpless despair, the front door makes an unlocking sound. Nervously, Mr. King remarks to the intruder that he was in the army (Note: It is unspecified whether he is a war veteran or not, implying that he most likely does mandatory national service.) only to take his wife with him for support anyway as he leaves the kitchen to investigate the hallway. Now alone, Timothy smells flour, baking and then spaghetti. He suddenly feels a suffocating pressure on his mouth, like a hand trying to shut him up, except the "fingers" brushing his cheek feel like thin sticks. When his parents return to the kitchen, Timothy can breathe again and the smells disappear.

For a while after the incident, to his mother's surprise, Timothy eats everything given to him. She later theorises that The Spaghetti Man had visited them that day, explaining he kidnaps children who refuse to eat their dinners and turns them into Pasta. She assumes Timothy has been spared and given a chance of redemption. Timothy scoffs at the tall tale, despite having been eating his food these past days. This soon changes the next breakfast when Timothy reverts to his old behaviour when a plate of toast is placed in front of him. He rants about his hatred of the food and his family and declares he will not eat it as he leaves the kitchen. Pushed to her limit, Mrs. King follows and drags him back to the table as she tells him she will not let him leave until he finishes.

The next day, Timothy is still at the table with the day-old toast in front of him. He tries to get rid of it: he throws it in the bin, he sneaks out of the house and shoves it in a postman's bag, and tries to feed it to the goldfish, but the toast always returns to his plate. The next day, Mr. King goes to work and Mrs. King leaves to go shopping. Now that Timothy is home alone, he sets out his revenge: he empties the fridge into a bin bag and stuffs it behind his parents' bed; he breaks every lightbulb in the house with rocks from the garden and kicks the cat; he breaks a door with a screwdriver; and goes to the bathroom to flood it. As he finishes doing so, the latch on the front door unlocks. Timothy hears it and, believing it to be his mother, stands triumphant as the bathwater rises, excited to see her reaction. But when the bath overflows and the bathroom door flies open, no one and nothing is there, save for the smell of flour and spaghetti. When Timothy's mother comes home and finds the house in shambles, she turns off the taps, calling out for her son in vain.

Timothy wakes up in a room full of children with labels of food on their clothes. A girl with red, curly hair explains they are in Italy and will be turned into food by the Spaghetti Man. She shows off her curly twirls label and points out Timothy's lasagna one. Timothy gags at the thought of becoming lasagna and attempts to start a revolt, jumping onto a table and yelling at the children that they have been lied to and should leave. But in the doorway behind him stands an evil-looking, smug chef smacking flour off of his hands. That night, Venetian citizens sleep as the abandoned factory returns to operation until sunrise with the black car leaving through the open gates. Back home in the UK, Mr. and Mrs. King's lives improve without Timothy's mealtime tantrums; Mrs King notices Timothy is gone but finds herself happier for it, never telling her husband. When he goes back to work one morning, she prepares some lasagna for that night's dinner. It's implied that the lasagna is, in fact, their son.

=== The Princess's Clothes ===
Felicity is constantly pampered by her father, who nicknames her Princess, to the point of seemingly believing she was one. She has so many clothes and shoes, she has been featured in Vogue and Harpers and Queen articles. One day, her mother invites a wrinkly woman with a crocodile-skin briefcase into the house. This woman is Miss Shears, a representative of a fashion catalogue, and Felicity's mother wants to show her daughter different clothes. Felicity throws a tantrum because her father buys her new clothes every week but she is ignored as Miss Shears shows off brochures advertising outfits that were not pink and lacy. Felicity continues her tantrum and runs out of the room, leaving her mother to choose her the frumpiest outfits she has ever seen. She refuses to talk to her mother for many days and hides in the garden shed when the outfits are delivered. She was horrified to discover that her old clothes had been moved out of her wardrobe and replaced with clothes of different shades of blue. Her mother begs her to try something on but Felicity refuses until her mother angrily gives up. Because she can not find her old clothes, she improvised with bath towels, a fishing hat, Wellington boots and a fur coat, and ran for the school bus, leaving her parents to bicker about who raised her better.

Felicity regrets her decision once she arrives at school. Other pupils tease her and the costume felt uncomfortable everywhere. In order not to make her mother win, she plans to get rid of her new outfits by rewrapping them and sending them back to Miss Shears. At 11:30 pm that night, she wakes up and took the wrapping paper out of her bin. A black parcel sends to "Only to be opened by a princess" appears on the floor, containing tiny scissors inside. Felicity goes to the wardrobe and cuts all her new clothes to shreds. As she laughs triumphantly, snipped fabric fell on the floor in rags until she had no clothes left. The scissors jumped out of her hand and landed on the top shelf of the wardrobe where her old clothes have been hidden and destroyed them as well. The fabric in the room creates a tornado that spins around Felicity and carries her across the room; Miss Shears' face appears in the window and she floats away on a broomstick. In the morning, all of Felicity's trimmed clothes have disappeared and her parents are confused. She goes to school in her duvet and has done so ever since.

=== The Black Knight ===
King Basil ruled Ruritania for numerous years and was loved and respected by his subjects and government. Unfortunately, he never had heirs so when he died, everyone panicked. The government eventually decided to advertise the position through an audition-like process but they had no luck and a year later the government was certain that everyone in Ruritania had been considered and interviewed. Word reached Draconia on the other side of the border and its Prince Egor could not wait. The next day, he assembled his army and charged through the country, destroying every Ruitanian thing in their paths until they reached the kingdom walls. Egor abandoned the team for time to himself and discovered the River Alter, a famously magical river. After washing his face, his reflection gives him words of encouragement before being dispersed by a pike near the ripples, which inspires Egor to ambush the castle.

The overnight battle was long and bloody, and Ruitania gained a cruel, selfish king the next morning. All the fun that Basil had allowed was now banned by King Egor, and his subjects barely left their homes. Members of parliament woke up to guards sending them to the dungeons and children of peasants were assigned to work for the monarchy. Egor loved being king because everyone automatically became a yes man but he soon got bored of crying peasants. He went back to Alter for more tips and the reflection scolds him for giving up before it is eaten by the pike. Egor returned to the castle crueller and would execute anyone who questioned his ideas. It later led to paranoia of being overthrown, despite ruling successfully for two years, so Egor went back to Alter for a confidence boost. His reflection had gone and the water was rippling. He could not recognise his face but then a giant pike jumped out and ate him whole. When news reached the Black Knight was dead, the newly released government appointed a woman named Gertrude as queen, despite many people wanting the pike that killed Egor to be king instead. However, Queen Gertrude allowed the pike to live in the Royal Goldfish Pond for the rest of its long life.

=== Glued to the Telly ===
Herbert Hinkley frequently occupies the television in the family living room: he sits in his armchair all day, eating crisps and channel surfing, and never left the television's side. One night, his parents allow him to sleep downstairs and a delighted Herbert celebrates with salt and vinegar-flavoured crisps instead of his usual cheese and onion. As he sleeps, lightning strikes the TV aerial connected to Herbert's television, turning it on. A tiny white dot on the screen grows until it makes the room glow and sucks the sleeping Herbert inside. He wakes up to his mother's face looking at him from the other side of the television but he is too small to be seen. He runs to a red light at the bottom of a dark corridor and opens the door after moving a hot, electric coil. Behind the door is a newsroom where newsreader Gayna Honeycombe is reporting his disappearance. Herbert runs towards her but she and the set disappears. An electric cable falls from the ceiling and acid starts to ooze through the floor. Herbert escapes into another corridor which is full of doors. He opens a door and a little girl playing board games with a clown scares him off; another door led to a violent bar brawl scene from a western film that unexpectedly features Sooty and Sweep hiding under a table, waiting for their programme to start. Herbert then becomes a hospital patient during an Australian soap opera and discovers that he is going to turn into a cheese and onion crisp if he never gets out of the television. He runs out of the hospital in a panic, hoping to look for a shower room—his fingers has already changed but showering in his clothes might slow the process down.

In his living room, Herbert's parents give up searching for their son and has been channel surfing all morning. Herbert goes from rushing into a burning building to running past Batman and Robin to featuring on a cooking show, where the TV chef stuffs him into the oven. Herbert's parents laugh so hard, they do not notice the television smoking, burning and then disintegrating into a pile of ash. When they stop, Herbert's mother takes out the vacuum cleaner and picks up the cheese and onion crisp on top of the ash. She places it in a tupperware box and puts it in the back of the fridge for Herbert to eat whenever he comes back.

=== The Barber of Civil ===
Many unspecified years ago, there was a seaside town called Saucy by Sea which had a reputation for being the home of the rudest children in the world, but this was quickly changing. A handsome, moustachioed barber arrived in the town and opened up his shop, offering free haircuts to numerous children that lived there. Not wanting to pass a free offer, the barber became popular with many parents, particularly the parents of children staying true to the town's stereotype. Any of the rude children that were sent there would leave the shop well-behaved. Despite their children's hair looking no different to when they left, the parents were still the barber's biggest fans.

At one Saucy school, there are two children named Tania Wilson and Perigrine, who are frequently tormenting their teachers with their refusal to cooperate and obey, and their irritating attempts to be the class clown. In one anecdote, Tania refuses to participate in P. E. in her underwear, which is mandatory in the school rules. When the P. E. teacher demands a reason, Tania claims she has a medical note from her mother, climbs onto a horse and sings "La!!" and the angry teacher sends her to the headmaster's office. She meets Peregrine there, who has been sent because he makes fun of a teacher in a rude parody of "Jingle Bells". The headmaster orders them inside, planning to scare them with his cane, but Peregrine and Tania chant fearlessly, which makes him collapse and call for matron, implying a sudden mental breakdown.

One day, the barber arrives for a school visit. The students in Peregrine and Tania's classes stand and chorus a "Good morning" as he enters, whereas Peregrine and Tania ignore him and jeer vulgarly, respectively. The barber smiles and tells the children that they must visit his shop tomorrow as he writes in a notebook. The next day, Tania and Peregrine step into the barbershop and look around as they wait for their haircuts. Tania notices there are no mirrors and that the strange barber's chair looks more like a dentist's chair but Peregrine is at the till, opening one of the barber's jars of slugs to hold a slug over his mouth as if he is going to eat them. The barber walks in suddenly making Peregrine drop the jar and the slug in shock, almost choking as he swallowed. The jar smashes against the floor and the slugs slither around making noises that remind Tania of voices. The barber gathers the slugs and stuffs them in his apron pocket. He locks the front door, opens up his barber utensils, takes out a knife and licks it; the children are stunned into silence as the barber wiped off the blood trail from the blade. He ties a bib around Peregrine and straps him into the barber chair. "Open wide," he orders. Tania screams in shock and the barber explains he is not actually a barber: he travels around to different towns to stop rude children's misbehaviour by cutting off parts of their tongues and washing out their mouths thoroughly until they are not rude anymore.

Tania and Peregrine return to school the next day with shorter tongues and politer attitudes. Meanwhile, the barbershop in the high street have closed and the barber has left town to find more business. He is never seen again.

=== The Man With a Chip on His Shoulder ===
One morning, a man wakes up irritated because a chip grew out of his shoulder.

=== The Giant Who Grew Too Big For His Boots ===
Huge Hugh is a giant who lives in a countryside cottage with his wife in Wales. He has messy black hair, and a warty face and tongue, which gives him a large lisp that sprays everything he faced. His wife tries her best to cater to his bullying demands but one day, Hugh grows until he cannot fit in their home. He stomps next door and threatens Mr Sparrow, implying a promise to almost drown him and his family with the speech impediment. The Sparrow family rush out of their house as fast as they can through the giant spittle and Hugh immediately moves in, throwing out the furniture and sleeping downstairs. By the next morning, he's grown again to the point where his limbs are sticking out of the windows, and his head pulls the roof off the building. "I NEED MORE SPACE!" he yells; the spittle rains for fifteen seconds over a nearby village. After eating a forest, Hugh approaches a church and scares off the vicar and praying villagers inside with his lisping. Luckily, the church is warm and big enough for Hugh to sleep in overnight, but he woke up cold and higher than the lowest clouds. He stomps across the border to London and ate pigeons from Trafalgar Square and drinks from the River Thames. His lisping rains across the British Isles as he crosses to other English cities to find space. Hugh is so tall, the President of the United States telephones him and warned that the United States Armed Forces will not hesitate to attack if he attempts to cross the Atlantic Ocean, so Hugh steps across and eats the entire American military.

"I NEED MORE SPACE!" Hugh yells, his lisp raining on Africa for six hours. Eventually, he goes to sleep with his feet in Australia, his bottom in India and his head on the Arctic, but he wakes up bigger than the Solar System and the Milky Way. A satellite floats around his nose and asks him not to speak anymore because he will drown the Earth. Hugh grabs it and stuffs it in his mouth. The antenna pokes a tongue wart, which "pops" Hugh like a balloon. He floats back to Earth and lands in a rainy grassland at 5 centimetres (2.0 in) tall, smaller than the blades. He demands a snail hands over its home but the snail refuses and he gets crushed under by it.

=== The Wooden Hill ===
Five-year-old Jack is bored and restless. He wants his mother to read him a bedtime story but she is too busy with a magazine crossword puzzle. After he annoys her to get her attention, his mother tells him to get a book from upstairs but Jack refuses, fidgeting around her. His mother orders him to go and puts him outside of the room; Jack has fear of the dark and his imagination turns spooky: silhouettes of moths in the street lamp lights remind him of bats and the staircase handrail looks like a ribcage. He begins to wonder whether the bogeyman is actually more plausible than he originally thought as he tries the stairs. He hears a low rumble and a creak, and runs as fast as he can to his parents' bedroom, slamming the door behind him in case a troll is trying to chase him. He soon rushes back onto the landing when he mistakes a flowing curtain as a ghost. The bogeyman's domain is the bathroom, which is next to the other staircase that led to his bedroom on the second floor. Jack crawls past the door so that the bogeyman cannot spot him through the keyhole and tries to ignore the dripping sound inside (the bogeyman is notoriously gooey). When he gets up to the second landing, he remembers the fire monster, who loves to torment him every night by whimpering and scratching the door. He sees it lying outside his bedroom and jumps at it, grabbing the cat by its fur; the panicked cat frees from his grip and runs away. Jack returns to the living room as fast as he can with the bedtime story in hand. His mother scoffs that she knows he is overreacting and takes the copy of Dracula as he squeezes himself next to her.

=== The Litter Bug ===
The story begins with a history lesson about the rubbish bin. Before its invention, the streets were filthy and rats of all sizes were everywhere, attacking babies and eating the rubbish. Trousers were barely worn in favour of tights so that rats could not crawl up people's legs. Mr Dustbin decided to clean the streets with several buckets and dumping the mess in a place where the rats would not find it, which caused them to go extinct and the streets to become cleaner. Despite Mr Dustbin dying as a successful and revered inventor, people found no need for his work anymore, now that the rats would never trouble them again, but because of this, the streets' litter piles became mountains and no amount of dumping into the seas could slow it down. It was now a national emergency and the fault of one person: a morbidly obese girl named Bunty Porker, who ate almost every hour and threw her containers and other used packets across her neighbourhood and town, creating a litter mountain the size of two mountains. The UK smelt terrible and attracted insects from all over the world, from bloodsuckers to disease-spreaders. The Queen telephones the Prime Minister and demands that he fixes the issue, so Parliament decides Bunty should be captured by the army, led by Colonel Buffy.

At midnight, Bunty sneaks out of her house to climb the mountain and dump her rubbish wherever she could find a spot. The army ambush her with nets and sticks and surround her tightly as Colonel Buffy announces they had come to arrest her. Bunty refuses politely and swings her arms like a propeller, slapping all the soldiers away, and continues climbing the mountain. When Bunty gets to the top, she spots a wire under her foot that was moving. Bunty realizes that it resembled a feeler that she discovered was attached to a giant European black bug which was hiding underneath her. It burst out of the top, snapping its pincers and ate Bunty and the mountain within seconds. Once the bugs had eaten all the litter, they left the UK to find more food, but everyone had learnt their lesson. The bin became a popular household item again.

=== Goblin Mountain ===
Whenever Joseph Alexander finishes reading a book, he tears out its pages and throws them out of a nearby window, irritating his parents. One evening, his parents are shocked and furious to discover that he had destroyed every book in the house and ground him in the attic. Joseph does not understand the issue: every time he throws the loose pages out of the window, he assumes that they will plant themselves in the ground and grow into new books. The attic is dark, draughty and messy; outside, a barn owl keeps screeching. Joseph stays awake, thinking about a plan to escape. He rushes to a trunk and opens it, discovering the large, black book that weighs the trunk down. Joseph takes the book and looks through it: the front cover has an eagle sitting on a mountain and inside is full of illustrations of shapeshifting and devil-worshipping goblins and symbols; Joseph assumes it is a book of spells.

After reading, Joseph pushes the trunk to the window for leverage. He throws the ripped pages of the "spellbook" out of the window into the night sky. The pages float towards the mountain adjacent to Joseph's house and explode into flames on impact, turning into fleeing crows. The front cover in Joseph's hands grow hot and the eagle's eyes glow red, so Joseph throws it out of the window as well, hitting the tree and setting it on fire. Joseph's mother bursts into the attic just as Joseph is kidnapped by a giant eagle; she is blown over by a gust of wind before she knew what was happening. The eagle flies Joseph around the mountain and drops him on a tree where he hears a voice loudly whisper "Beware!" He realises that he was now on a ledge next to a giant, smelly cave. A goblin appears and slams a metal leash around his neck, and drags him inside towards a courtroom. Jeering goblins in seats and crows in the ceiling watch on as Joseph is pulled in front of a goblin judge. He is charged with destroying the secret, ancient book The Great Book of Tharg (implied to be a book thought to have been missing for years). Joseph continues to demand a trial as the goblins in the audience throw out execution suggestions. The judge explains there is no need for a trial because Joseph had torn too many books up to be innocent and orders him to be planted. Years from now, he would grow into a tree and be cut down to make paper.

Joseph's mother opens the attic door and asks why he is screaming. Joseph realises he is back home and must have had a nightmare. He jumps into his mother's arms and promises that he will never vandalise another book and she forgives him, taking him back to his room. A giant eagle feather on the floor is picked up by a gust of wind and floats out of the window towards the mountain.

=== Sweets ===
Every time Thomas Rachet visits a shop with his mother, he causes her embarrassment by misbehaving because he wants sweets. One afternoon, his vandalisms and pranks he does gets him and his mother escorted out of every shop they visit: in the supermarket, he eats from the aisles, spills yoghurt, races around on a shopping trolley, pickpocketed from customers, and climbs shelves; in the chemist's, he plays with toothpaste, writes with suncream and feeds unwrapped lollipops to a baby; in the bakery, he stuffed a doughnut into a charity box; in the butcher's, he threw eggs; in the newsagents, he starts arguments with staff over a comic book; and tripped over an elderly man in the bank's service queue. Despite becoming a high street pariah, Thomas still demands sweets as his mother weakly tries to punish him. When his mother tells him she will only buy sweets for him if he does behave, Thomas yells that he hates her and runs away until he can not hear her voice calling after him anymore.

He stops in an alleyway with a cobblestone road. It leads to an empty street full of tall buildings and an old-fashioned sweet shop. Thomas knocks on the sweet shop door for a while until an old man answers and allows him inside. The shop does not remind Thomas of a sweet shop and was filthy, full of mannequins, and smelt of cats. The old man locks the door and says that he is going to get Thomas' favorites: lemon sherbets, liquorice twisters and rock candy. Slightly suspicious, Thomas points out that the old man knows everything about him, even his name, and the man confirms all assumptions as he reaches for a net, adding that he knows about Thomas' shop misbehaviors. Thomas admits he only acts that way because he only wanted sweets. The old man touches a switch on the wall and mechanical sounds are heard from another room as he beckons Thomas to follow him. Thomas continues his confession, admitting he hates going shopping with his mother but the old man replies he will get used to it soon, and catches him in the net.

When Thomas regains consciousness, he discovers that he has been turned into a papier-mâché statue. His body is passed around shops as he waits for his mother to find him, assuming she remembers to look for him.

=== The Top Hat ===
To celebrate Benjamin's birth, an uncle buys him a top hat, so his mother puts it in a cupboard for when he is old enough. However, once he can walk, Benjamin sneaks into his parents' bedroom and his mother found him wearing it on a pile of ransacked clothes. Ever since, Benjamin takes his uncle's present everywhere, using it as both a hat and a toy. His father gives him the nickname "Bunny" because rabbits are pulled out of top hats by magicians. When it eventually breaks apart from its age, Benjamin becomes depressed and barely leaves his bedroom. As his sixth birthday draws closer, Benjamin hopes he will get a replacement.

On his sixth birthday, Benjamin wakes up and approaches his parents. They look desperately at each other until his father sheepishly explains there were no top hats in any of the shops he went to. Benjamin throws a tantrum and locks himself back in his bedroom, and stays in there until his parents beg him at the door to come out and meet his birthday party guests. Benjamin obeys, but with an intention to sabotage if he cannot find a top hat. Unfortunately, none of the guests consider a top hat for a present so Benjamin sabotages party games, destroys his top hat birthday cake and attempts to gate-crash the party magician's act, but his mother forces him to be Marvelous Marvin's volunteer. The six-year-old magician's assistant appears from a box wearing a top hat. Benjamin demands he hands the hat over, ignoring the magician's insistence it is not for sale. Benjamin snatches the hat and runs to his bedroom, with his parents, the magician and the assistant chasing him.

He locks his door and tries the hat on in front of the mirror. It wriggles. He takes it off and tips out a rabbit, that runs away to hide under his bed. Benjamin realizes the hat can grant wishes and he wishes for a racing bike, and other gifts that he never got. On the other side of his door, Marvin warns Benjamin's parents that the hat had been in his family for generations and can make situations go horribly awry if in the wrong hands. Eventually, the group break the door off the hinges, landing on top of each other in a pile. Knowing how much trouble he was in now; Benjamin wishes that he "wasn't here". The hat launches itself across the room and a giant hand grows out of it, reaching towards Benjamin. He screams as it grabs him by the neck of his shirt and drags him inside. He is never seen again. Marvin will later attempt many times to conjure Benjamin back, but Benjamin has used up all of the magic; if Marvin ever listens closely, he can hear the faint sound of Benjamin's voice, begging for forgiveness.

=== The Childhood Snatcher ===
Amos Stirling is a stupid man desperate to become famous. He realizes if he had a famous child, he would become a famous father. He advertises a proposal in the national newspaper and marries a lonely woman from a northern Scottish island named Betty, who soon gives birth to a daughter. Amos insists on naming her after Albert Einstein, despite Betty's annoyance, but the daughter is named Albert regardless. Her bedroom is redecorated with a variety of textbooks and chemistry equipment, and her father had made himself her tutor; Betty's protests are ignored by her husband whenever she argues that Albert cannot read or talk yet, and Amos even installed steel window shutters so nothing outside Albert's bedroom could distract from lessons. One night, a hook-nosed figure wearing a hooded cloak and carrying a silk sack appears in Albert's bedroom, waking her up. The figure says he had been sent by Amos and introduces himself as The Childhood Snatcher, then plucks a hair strand out of Albert's hair, drops it in the sack, and floated out of the window as dust.

By two-years-old, Albert could talk, walk and had the education skills of a high school student. As Betty's concerns continued to be ignored, Amos continued pushing his daughter to success by increasing her curriculum. Unfortunately for Betty, Amos' desire for nepotism damaged Albert's relationships with other toddlers her age because they were still wearing nappies and were only interested in "childish" games, whereas she only had interests in everything Amos exposed her to and could speak four languages (and was preparing for her fifth). The Childhood Snatcher returned every night before her birthdays to take a strand from her head. By the eve of Albert's third birthday, she had already graduated from university, became Prime Minister and moved in to 10 Downing Street. The Childhood Snatcher reappears, and Albert wakes up, assuming Amos had sent for him again. The Snatcher pulls off his hood, revealing the grotesque face of an old man, and explains he wants her youth and beauty, and takes her fourth hair. It was too late when Amos and Betty burst into the room: The Snatcher had disappeared, and their daughter had become an old woman. Betty furiously jumps at her husband, screaming that if he hadn't had forced Albert to be an adult while she was still a child, none of this would ever have happened. Amos lets her rant as he stares at the floor in embarrassment.

== Development ==
I wrote The Spaghetti Man up and sent it off to 22 publishers. One replied – the very lovely Pam Royds from André Deutsch – you always fall in love with your first editor. She didn't exactly say "OK, I'll commission a book," but she did say, "write a load more stories like these and I'll tell you when to stop."

— Jamie Rix, The Gruesome Creatives, Honeycomb Animation, April 2011

As a child, Jamie Rix had always had a fascination with gore and horror. A teacher had inspired him to write whatever he wanted, so he wrote a story that featured blood and mutilation and read it aloud to the rest of his class. It began his interest in writing stories. Rix had been a television/radio producer and writer for over ten years when he began a career as a children's author. On holiday in France with his wife and children, he told his eldest son that if he refused to eat his dinner, the Spaghetti Man would kidnap him and turn him into lasagne as he pointed at spaghetti outside a shop. The white lie made his four-year-old eat every meal without hesitations and Rix noted that he could make a story that could do the same to other children. He wrote The Spaghetti Man story out and sent it to publishers. Pam Royds from André Deutsch's eponymous publishing house asked for more stories similar to it, creating the Grizzly Tales for Gruesome Kids collection.

Rix later implied that the German children's book Struwwelpeter was an inspiration for the series. When he was a child, his mother had given him a copy and he read "The Story of the Thumb-Sucker": "It was about a boy who would not stop sucking his thumb and had both his thumbs cut off by the Long Red-Legged Scissor Man. That story was brilliant. I had nightmares for weeks. When I hear that story now I can still feel the scissors cutting through my thumb bones. And I fell in love with the pictures. They were so matter-of-fact about death. And there was so much blood!" After Royds' suggestion, he realised as he wrote more stories that "what I was writing was a modern collection of Cautionary Tales – Unlike the stories of Roald Dahl where the adults tend to be bad and the children the heroes, I had bad children in my stories who needed to be taught a lesson!"

== Themes ==
Whereas the sequel relates to the title of the book, Grizzly Tales for Gruesome Kids stars characters with varying behaviors. "The New Nanny", "Sweets", "The Barber of Civil", "The Top Hat", "The Spaghetti Man" and "The Princess's Clothes" are about spiteful children that misbehave to get their own way, whereas Joseph from "Goblin Mountain" is ignorant of his actions; "The One-Tailed, Two-Footed, Three-Bellied, Four-Headed, Five-Fingered, Six-Chinned, Seven-Winged, Eight-Eyed, Nine-Nosed, Ten-Toothed Monster" ends happily with Tulsidor exposing his village's prejudices; and "The Wooden Hill" implies that a five-year-old's imagination has been manipulated by adult fiction. "The Black Knight" is about greed and abusing power with no children characters present, similarly to "The Giant Who Grew too Big for his Boots" and "The Childhood Snatcher".

Other stories that star children do not leave the adults blameless: "Glued to the Telly" is about Herbert's television addiction is enabled by his parents who want him to be happy, and Jack's mother's reluctance to interact with him in "The Wooden Hill" leads to her reading him a horror novel for adults as a bedtime story. "The Childhood Snatcher" is about Amos' vicariousness through his daughter, which makes her grow up too fast. However, "The Barber of Civil" is set in a town full of rude children so Tanya and Peregrine reflect their society, whereas Bunty from "The Litter Bug" is never implied to have parents or a family that either exists or are aware of her behavior.

== Cultural references, naming conventions ==
Grizzly Tales for Gruesome Kids would begin the recurring feature of using cultural references and naming conventions to add to the humor in the short stories, which would appear in the books that would follow. Wordplay is used on the titles "The Barber of Civil" and possibly "The Childhood Snatcher": the former is a reference to The Barber of Seville, whereas "The Childhood Snatcher" could be a reference to the Child Catcher from Chitty Chitty Bang Bang. "The Man with a Chip on his Shoulder" is a literal interpretation of the idiom chip on your shoulder, and "The Litter Bug" is this for the phrase "litterbug", as well as the litter-eating bugs that infest the UK.

Ruritania from "The Black Knight" is a country-name frequently used in fiction, based on the fictional country of the same name from The Prisoner of Zenda; Prince Igor is from the neighboring Draconia, which implied his controlling behaviour. In "The New Nanny", Tristram and Candy's parents—Mr. and Mrs. Frightfully-Busy—are workaholics, which is why their children are always supervised by Mrs. Mac.

== Adaptations ==
Only "The One-Tailed, Two-Footed, Three-Bellied, Four-Headed, Five-Fingered, Six-Chinned, Seven-Winged, Eight-Eyed, Nine-Nosed, Ten-Toothed Monster", "The Black Knight", and "The Man with a Chip on His Shoulder" were not adapted for either the CITV or Nickelodeon cartoon. "The Man with a Chip on a Shoulder" is the shortest story in the Grizzly Tales franchise at two to three sentences long, but it is unclear why the rest were not adapted.

For the stories that were adapted, there were a few changes. For example:

- The altercation with the final nanny in "The New Nanny" (Series 1, Episode 1) removes Tristram smacking the nanny with a bat.
- In "The Princess's Clothes" (Series 1, Episode 7):
  - It is not included that Felicity's wardrobe had been discussed in fashion magazines;
  - Felicity hid in the garden shed to get away from her new clothes until she fell asleep that night and her father took her up to bed. The cartoon shows days and (implied) seasons changing, followed by Felicity only leaving the shed because her clothes got dirty;
  - Felicity was written to have red hair. Her ethnicity was not specified but in the cartoon, she was portrayed as black with black hair;
  - The revenge was slightly changed: Felicity had her own scissors before getting new ones from the magic parcel, and she had no intention to return them back to Miss Shears because she was going to cut them.
- "The Barber of Civil" (Series 1, Episode 9) did not include Tania's surname, Wilson;
- "The Spaghetti Man" (Series 1, Episode 2) had Timothy's mother explain to Timothy about the Spaghetti Man the second after the figure leaves and did not include Timothy's attempts of getting rid of his toast and breaking lightbulbs as part of his revenge on his mother. The Girl with curly swirls does not explain to Timothy about their fate and the Spaghetti Man only appears as a shadow silhouette.

== Reception and legacy ==
Grizzly Tales for Gruesome Kids was Jamie Rix's debut into book publishing and received a positive reaction from critics. The Independent on Sunday quipped, "Be warned – Jamie Rix's splendidly nasty short stories can be genuinely scary, but as the protaganists [sic] are obnoxious brats with names like Peregrine and Tristram, you may find yourself cheering as they meet their sticky ends." The Guardian wrote: "Fifteen well-crafted stories each show how the disorderly and the fantastic lurk just beneath the ordinary and the workaday [sic]. A smashing summer evening's dipping-into trove this one." When the original four books in the series were re-released, the online blurb tagline read: "A raucous book filled with demented and horrible children who get their just desserts. Luscious writing spiced up with injections of carbolic humour." The book was also reviewed in the New Zealand and Australian Magpies Magazine in 1993.

The book's popularity led to three sequel books: Ghostly Tales for Ghastly Kids, Fearsome Tales for Fiendish Kids and More Grizzly Tales for Gruesome Kids. In 1993, the founders of Honeycomb Animation were referred to Rix's series after the head of Carlton Television agreed to a two-programmes deal. One of Honeycomb's founders, Susan Bor, later recalled: "What really appealed to me about adapting these wonderful stories for TV was that they were new and fresh, there was nothing out there like it and I particularly wanted the design and look of the series to have that originality." The children's animated adaptation, Grizzly Tales for Gruesome Kids, aired on CITV in 2000 and concluded in 2006 with 79 episodes (78 ten-minute and 1 30-minute special) and six series. Nigel Planer, who co-produced and performed on the CITV programme, said of the books: "Grizzly Tales has been a good first reading experience for most of the children I know, and I was giving the books as presents long before Jamie Rix and I started to record the series. It encourages children to read because there is a certain element of dare in it; 'are you brave enough to read this? On your own? At night?'" Planer narrated stories from the books on BBC Radio throughout the 1990s. From 1990, the show appeared on BBC Radio 5, and in 1994, it appeared on BBC Radio 4. The Observer later referred to the radio series as "among the best relics of the old Radio 5", after previously calling "The New Nanny" "splendidly tart" and "excellently read by Nigel Planer". Another book series began, renamed Grizzly Tales: Cautionary Tales for Lovers of Squeam!, which had nine books—eight full of original stories, and the ninth a compilation of previously published stories. Honeycomb Animation created a spin-off/reboot cartoon programme for NickToons based on the newer stories in the franchise, and aired between May 2011 and November 2012 with 26 episodes split into two series.

Grizzly Tales for Gruesome Kids won the Nestlé Smarties Book Prize for Fiction with a nine to eleven-year-old target audience. Both cartoon adaptations were popular and critically acclaimed with their respective networks. The CITV series won the Silver Spire Award for Best Children's Program at the Golden Gate Awards, the Pulcinella Award for Best Series for Children from Cartoons on the Bay, and Best Children's Series at the British Animation Awards, whereas the NickToons series won Best Children's Series at the Broadcast Awards. Both were nominated for a Best Children's Series BAFTA.

== Publication history ==
=== Reissues ===
The original front cover was illustrated by Bobbie Spargo, who was also the illustrator. After the cartoon series aired on CITV, the covers were re-designed by Honeycomb Animation, the producers of the cartoon, which was published in January 2000.

The book is said to have officially gone out of print in 2009. It was briefly available on Kindle in 2011, published by Orion.

Pub. date	Format	No. of pages	Publisher	Notes	ISBN	Ref(s)
17 May 1990	Hardback	112	André Deutsch Limited		ISBN 023398531X, 9780233985312	
24 September 1992	Paperback	141	Puffin Books	Went out of print in 1999	ISBN 0140345728, 9780140345728	
1 August 1993	Audio Cassette	3h 29m	Chivers Audio Books	Read by Andrew Sachs	ISBN 0745144659, 9780745144658	
28 July 1995	Audio Cassette	3h 29m	Calvalcade Story Cassettes	Audio from Chivers Audio Books; Distributed for library rental	ASIN 0745131220; ISBN 0745131220, 9780745131221	
21 January 2000	Paperback	192	Scholastic Books UK		ISBN 0439014468, 9780439014465	
2007	Audio CD	2h 57min	BBC Audiobooks	Audio from Chivers Audio Books	ISBN 9781405657693, 1405657693	
4 February 2009	Audiobook	—	AudioGO	Audio from Chivers Audio Books	ISBN 140842570X, 9781408425701	
2011	Kindle E-book	85	Amazon (Jamie Rix)		ASIN B0055POQBY; ISBN 978-1-908285-06-5, 1908285060	
2017	MP3 Audiobook		Brilliance Audio (Amazon Studios)	Audio from Chivers Audio Books	ISBN 9781536637809, 1536637807	

=== Singular stories ===
"The Barber of Civil" (along with Fearsome Tales for Fiendish Kids' "Death By Chocolate") was republished in 1998 by Macmillan Children's Books as part of the short story collection Scary Stories for Eight Year Olds by Helen Paiba.

== Awards and nominations ==
Year	Award	Category	Nominee	Result	Ref
1990	Nestlé Smarties Book Prize	Fiction, Age 9-11	Grizzly Tales for Gruesome Kids	Won	

== See also ==
- Grizzly Tales for Gruesome Kids
- Struwwelpeter – its inspiration
- Cautionary Tales for Children – poetry book that has been compared to the book
- Goosebumps – American speculative book series for children
