= Nasty Little Beasts =

2007 short stories by Jamie Rix

- First edition
- Author: Jamie Rix
- Audio read by: Rupert Degas
- Illustrator: Steven Pattison
- Language: English
- Series: Grizzly Tales
- Release number: 1 (of reboot); 5 (in franchise)
- Genre: children's horror
- Publisher: Orion Publishing Group
- Publication date: 5 April 2007
- Publication place: United Kingdom
- Pages: 125
- ISBN: 978-1-842-55549-1
- OCLC: 77257698
- Preceded by: More Grizzly Tales for Gruesome Kids
- Followed by: Gruesome Grown Ups

Nasty Little Beasts is a 2007 children's horror short-story collection by British author Jamie Rix. It was the first book published by Orion in the Grizzly Tales book series, which is continuation/reboot of the book series Grizzly Tales for Gruesome Kids, and is illustrated by Steven Pattison, who illustrated the rest of the books in this new series.

== Background and development ==
Before Nasty Little Beasts was published, Rix had published four books with Andre Deutsch, Scholastic, Puffin Books, and Hodder, which were used as inspiration to adapt into a children's cartoon series which aired on ITV's CITV timeslot between 2000 and 2006. After the fourth series, there were no more stories to adapt so the rest of the episodes contained newer stories with no source material.

Nasty Little Beasts contains novelised adaptations of four series five and two series six episodes. Possibly due to the cartoon's popularity, the rebooted book series resembles the cartoon with a storyteller framing device—this time, a hotel manager showing the reader the misbehaving children staying in the rooms of The Hot Hell Darkness, all punished there for eternity, and explaining why and how they came to his hotel; each chapter dedicated to their stories. Illustrations show speech bubbles of voices interrupting the stories to comment on unfolding events or make snide comments.

== Synopsis ==
=== The Grub a Blub Blub ===
In Skegness, there is an unusual witchetty grub: a human-sized, anthropomorphic larva that watches television, eats crisps, and cries itself to sleep when stressed. It is nicknamed "The Grub A-Blub-Blub" and hosted at the Museum of Freaks and Oddities, enclosed behind a "DO NOT FEED" sign.

Once upon a time, the larva is Savannah Slumberson, a lazy girl who prefers watching television in her bedroom instead of joining her active parents' rock climbing and cycling holidays. Her parents frequently expect her to participate, and embarrass her when they sing her awake every morning at 7 am, already in their khaki shorts (either in her room or outside her bedroom window, depending on whether she remembers to lock her bedroom door the night before). She considers herself "cursed", and becomes lazier out of spite.

For a March holiday, Savannah campaigns for a visit to a Bridlington bed and breakfast, but her father announces they will be camping instead. The next morning, the family dresses into their lycra and cycles to the site, except for Savannah—she hates wearing lycra and fakes a cramp, so she sleeps under a sleeping bag as her parents' bikes drag her there. She wakes to read a "Fit Camp" sign as her parents ride towards a camping lodge to meet the owner, Mrs Evadne Sprite. Savannah dreads the holiday to come as Sprite explains camp activities, and tension arises when she learns no one is allowed to spend mornings in bed. A sticky witchetty grub falls from a nearby tree and lands on Savannah's head, so she crushes it to death with her bike helmet; Sprite adds that the grubs' clinginess are why she encourages her customers to choose many active activities as possible.

Savannah attempts to sleep for seven days, but her parents insist she wakes up on time so they can sightsee together. They visit museums of unconventional themes, a church, and an aqueduct. As she eats a bowl of grubs, Sprite overhears Slumberson reject another sightseeing trip in favour of holidaying in her own way, so she offers Slumberson's parents a midnight bat walk the next evening. Slumberson had spent the day in her tent sleeping and eating pizza, and does not care she will be alone for a while, but Sprite advises her to stay in her sleeping bag in case the full moon entices grubs to act unnatural. Six hours later, Slumberson awakes to plopping sounds and the tent roof sinking. She wraps herself in her bag and evacuates the tent, only to be covered and smothered in the web of witchetty grubs.

Her parents return at sunrise, finding a giant witchetty grub that terrifies them. They shoo the grub away, end their holiday and leave for home, and Sprite loans their lot to a family from Skegness. One of the male family members is a museum curator.

=== Monty's Python ===
In Cheshire lives Monty, who chases his younger sister Mayflower around their farmhouse with any insects he could find. When he has no insects, he pranks her by claiming she overlooks an insect he places in her vicinity, and cackles at her paranoid shrieks. One day, he returns home from the pet shop with a python he names SisterEater, making Mayflower scream so loud, framed pictures fall off the wall and a light bulb breaks. Now with a partner in crime, Monty's bullying increases. The mice SisterEater ate helps when Monty almost poisons Mayflower with a "mouse teabag" in her mug and accidentally shows her a terrified mouse running out of the snake's mouth.

It will backfire a week later, when SisterEater's overeating causes a growth spurt and a demand for more food. Monty purposely introduces the python to several of Mayflower's pets, which he eats without hesitation—even Mayflower's pony, which still has her friend Miranda sitting in the pony's saddle. Each unconventional meal continues SisterEater's growth spurts and Monty's options had run out. His mother walks in on Mayflower trapped in a pot and scolds her son, so Monty decides to disown SisterEater any way he can.

SisterEater has grown so much, Monty threads his body through six bins. Mayflower discovers this and scolds her brother. Monty takes SisterEater to the bathroom to flush him down the toilet, but his size makes for a long struggle. SisterEater blocks the toilet with no sign of improvement and Monty grows paranoid, crossing his legs instead of reuniting with SisterEater when he urinates. Mayflower takes pleasure in her brother's misery, jeering and laughing at him for hours. On day four, Monty gives in and sneaks to the toilet; SisterEater latches his jaw on Monty's head and drags him down the drain. In the sewer, Monty meets children sitting on the sewer ledge wearing collars with hanging metal name-tags—all apathetic to escape. A girl directs Monty's eyes to a wall of various animals and species, but Monty still attempts to escape. SisterEater corners him with a smirk and says he is so hungry he can bite anything. Monty has not tried to escape since, now acting as a pet for SisterEater and the wall of flushed-out-of-boredom animals with his new friends. Mayflower sometimes turns an ear to the toilet to check her brother's cries of anguish can still be heard, and laughs all the way to bed. (Note: Monty's anguished cries are heard throughout the other stories. Eventually, the Night Night Porter loses his temper and flushes an unpinned grenade.)

=== The Lobster's Scream ===
"I want a more beautiful mummy!" are the first words Shannon Shellfish ever says, seconds after her birth. It sets the tone for her life ever since. Shannon has always been a demanding, ungrateful child and her parents are powerless to stop her. On her first birthday, Shannon furiously rejects her presents because she wants to go to Disneyland Paris, so her parents refund all the presents and obey. Despite being too young to enjoy the theme park rides, Shannon learns how empowering "I want" felt and becomes convinced they are magical. Nowadays, dinnertimes at the Shannon home are constantly eventful where Shannon demands food off her parents' plates and screams when they refuse. After a few minutes of screeching, they lose their patience and shuffle parts off their plate to their daughter, but Shannon then complains what they give her is too cold to eat. This routine is by design, and Shannon does not care whether she has more food on her plate or not—the more her parents give in to her demands, the more satisfying the day becomes.

One day, she demands her parents get her a dog. After picking a breed and leaving the pet shop, she dumps the dog in a skip. To her surprise, her parents immediately ask what she wants to replace it with. Shannon has never been asked this, and mulls over her answer for the rest of the day, until the doorbell rings. On the doorstep stands a giant lobster, possibly seven feet long if balanced on the tail. Shannon is in awe, but she immediately discovers it is a highly convincing costume. The wearer is Mr Pecorino, the owner of the Hubble Bubble Boil and Trouble restaurant, promoting his business door-to-door. Shellfish tackles him, demanding he gives her his costume, and threatens to stab him in the eyes with a stick when he tells her "'I want' never gets." Terrified, Pecorino promises to hand it over if she and her family dine at his restaurant.

Mr and Mrs Shellfish warn their daughter Shannon that one cannot have a lobster cooked and then not eat it, but Shannon insists she can do whatever she pleased. Since plans have changed, she needs to be attired suitably for a birthday meal at a sophisticated restaurant. She orders her mother to buy every outfit in a clothes' shop, and then calls them hideous as she dumps the bags outside. She eventually finds a dress she wants, the most expensive in another shop, but will later rip it apart because she wants it shorter. She demands a limousine escort, then a helicopter after her parents book the limousine, and a celebrity-like red carpet walk with cheering crowds as the family leave the house. On the day of the birthday meal, she shoos away the crowd and chooses to walk. Upon arriving at Hubble Bubble Boil and Trouble, she orders the largest lobster in the tank. When Pecorino sets the plate down, Shannon refuses to eat it. Her father reminds her of their lobster conversation and Pecorino is sad if this means the lobster dies for nothing. Shannon ignores the guilt-tripping and chases Pecorino with a wooden spoon, demanding the lobster costume. Pecorino gives in and leaves the cupboard containing it open so she can change. Meanwhile, her meal has come to life and gestures at the lobster tank. The lobsters climb out and rush around the room in formation, making everyone but Shannon's parents evacuate the building. Shannon, now in a costume, calls out for someone to zip the back just as the tank lobsters pick her up and carry her to a pot full of water mistakenly still boiling on the cooker.

=== Wolf Child ===
Wolves had terrorised the Scottish Highlands for centuries until 1743, when Eagan MacQueen decapitated one and cooked it for dinner. As the head stirred in the pot, its eyes slowly glazed over, as if the wolf was giving Eagan a confirming look of recognition. The wolfpack's revenge was set.

The MacQueen bloodline has continued into the present, and Eagan's descendants live by Darnaway Forest where he fought the pack three centuries ago. Recently, rumours circulated the area that wolfpacks had returned, intensifying when people reported sightings and a stag hunter died. The MacQueen family became just as alert as their neighbours. Elspet and Callum MacQueen have two children, one of them their newborn daughter Moira, and Highland wolves have a reputation of kidnapping babies to feed their families. However, their ten-year-old son Garth becomes excited at the idea—hopefully, his baby sister being kidnapped will mean his parents will stop ignoring him.

Garth starts behaving like a baby by throwing tantrums, staining walls with food, crying, thumb-sucking, and babbling. Callum and Elspet are not impressed, not once enthusiastically treating him the same as Moira. When Garth purposely binge eats junk food and vomits in the car, Callum warns his son that the wolves might kidnap him instead of Moira if he continues. After he finishes cleaning Garth and continues driving the family home, a wolf hiding in the bushes watches the car pass its hiding spot. That night, Garth wakes up in a panic after a nightmare about wolves trapping him in his bedroom, and vows to never imitate a baby again.

In the morning, Garth struggles climbing out of bed, discovering his legs are shrinking. When he tries to walk, he fails, reduced to crawling to his door with the handle he could not reach anymore. Garth calls for his parents to help, but they only hear their son resuming his baby imitations and ignore him for the rest of the day. Eventually, they become concerned when Garth's hair and teeth fall out and Elspet suspects it is "wolf-witchery". A howl rings through the air and they rush outside, remembering Moira is in her pram in their garden to get fresh air. Moira is still there, making them rush back in the house to check on their son. Garth has disappeared, never to be seen again—a successful diversion trap by avenging Highland wolves.

=== The Fruit Bat ===
Cherrie Stone never eats fruit, preferring to eat fast food and food containing saturated sugars. It makes her morbidly obese and frequently constipated. Her concerned parents take her to the doctor, who recommends fruit to help her use the toilet, so Mr and Mrs Stone begin hiding fruit everywhere to tempt her. When it fails, they wear fruit costumes and threaten to collect her from school dressed like this, so Cherrie attends another school secretly and her parents get arrested for trespassing. Then their hypnotherapy plan of playing audio of fruit to a sleeping Cherrie fails because the fruits that appear in her dreams will be destroyed by wasps.

It takes Cherrie a few days to devise a plan to convince her parents fruit is dangerous. Eventually, she tells them fruit bats smell the fruit in a human's digestive system and eats them alive as they sleep, the remains growing a never-ending stalk. It fails to convince them, but the argument is overheard by a far-away fruit bat, thankful it has found a place to find something to eat. At school, Cherrie becomes paranoid as she hears unfamiliar noises whenever she discards the fruit her mother hides all over her school belongings, and runs home when school finishes. At suppertime, her furious mother does not believe her stalking story so Cherrie goes to bed early; Mrs Stone sneaks a plum into Stone's breast pocket as she sleeps.

At midnight, the fruit bat opens Cherrie's window, flies onto her bed and eats a hidden tangerine. Then it smells the pocket plum and dives, accidentally stabbing Stone's chest, spraying blood everywhere. Stone wakes up hours later, outside her room, upside down, holding a half-eaten apple and being attacked by schoolchildren throwing stones at her. Examining her surroundings, she realises she has turned into a fruit bat as faeces fall from her and land on the children. Finally relieved of her constipation, Cherrie flies away to look for more apples.

=== The Clothes Pigs ===
On Cherry Tree Farm live four tiny, underweight piglets named Insy, Winsy, Nibble and Titch, whose siblings and other family members fight over the trough and successfully eat everything before they can get to it. Bertha the ballerina cow is concerned about the piglets' size, but the piglets are already determined to find food, no matter where it comes from.

Somewhere in an adjacent city lives Trueman "Truffle" Shuffle, an extremely lazy boy who dumps his clothes around his home, refuses to walk upstairs without being carried and makes his parents spread toothpaste on his brush. When his parents demand he takes up chores, Truffle insists serving their children's needs are parents' jobs. Eventually, his mother loses her temper and snaps back that "the clothes pigs" will emerge from his messes and chase him with anything they can think of—snout, teeth or trotters—if he refuses to change his attitude. Unconvinced, Truffle points out pigs will never be seen in the streets of their city, especially with all the butcher shops and traffic.

One day, Mrs Shuffle falls down the stairs after tripping over clothing her son has dropped earlier, breaking her leg. Truffle ignores her pained cries for help and orders her to make his dinner, and leaves the house to go the fish and chip shop when she "refuses". When he returns home, his father scolds him for his selfish behaviour, which is at a pitch to carry across the city through the vibrations of garden washing lines. It reaches Cherry Tree Farm and heard by the four starving piglets. They give their goodbyes to their mother and Bertha and leave the farm for the city. On the journey, they sneak into gardens and drag clothes off washing lines by pretending to be clothes pegs. They gather the clothes together and disguise themselves as a man, successfully infiltrating Truffle's city without the public noticing.

When they arrive at Truffle's house, the piglets sneak through the back door cat flap and hide the clothes in a coal hole, quickly jumping into Truffle's dumped ones nearby. Keeping the hood of Truffle's hoodie over his "head" helped fool Truffle's father, who never sees the front of "his son's" head. When the real Truffle returns home, the piglets try to stay out of his way as best as possible, and spy on him eating dinner jealously. Hours later, they wait impatiently under Truffle's mess for Truffle to go to sleep. Truffle enters, dresses into his pyjamas and climbs into bed, and the piglets emerge from the shadows. In the morning, the now-full piglets leave Truffle's hoodie on his empty bed, take their disguise and leave for the farm, returning the stolen clothes along the way. They celebrate their meal by sleeping in the sunshine, excited for their next dinner invitations.

== Themes ==
Ghostly Tales for Ghastly Kids was the only book in the series with a consistent theme in its collection (ghosts) until the revival. The stories of Nasty Little Beasts contain creatures across the animal kingdom who avenge children. They are either kidnapped or turned into one by the creatures/animals, whereas The Clothes Pigs ends with the main character being eaten by the creatures. Although the titles of the short stories refer to the "beasts" of the stories, the Independent Publishers Group argued the book's title actually refers to the children instead of the insects and animals that punish them.

== Cultural references, naming conventions ==
The book continues the Grizzly Tales convention of using cultural references and naming conventions to add to the stories' humour. The story titles use play-on-words for pun-based titles, such as "Monty's Python"—a pop-culture reference to the British comedy troupe Monty Python. Another type of title pun is "The Clothes Pigs", which also connects to the Cherry Tree Farm piglets, Truffle's mother's omen, and the piglets' methods to get their dinner. "The Lobster's Scream" is a possible reference to the noise lobsters make when they are boiled.

== Publication history ==
Nasty Little Beasts was released in paperback, e-book, Kindle e-book and audiobook, read by Rupert Degas. Orion Publishing distributed a two-part edit of Degas' narration as audio download releases with Spoken Network in 2007. It has also been translated in Swedish and Catalan.

Pub. date	Format	No. of pages	Publisher	Notes	ISBN
5 April 2007	Paperback	125	Orion Children's Group		ISBN 1842555499, 978-1-842-55549-1
4 May 2007	Audio download & CD		Orion Children's Group	1 hour running time; Contains stories "The Grub A-Blub-Blub", "Monty's Python" and "The Lobster's Scream"; Read by Rupert Degas; CD version released same day	ISBN 9780752890241
4 June 2007	Audio download & CD		Orion	1 hour running time; Contains stories "Wolf Child", "The Fruit Bat" and "The Clothes Pigs"; Read by Rupert Degas; CD version released same day	ISBN 9780752890258
1 November 2007	Book & CD		Orion	Edition selling Degas' two audiobook CDs and a copy of the book	ISBN 9780752890753
18 September 2008	E-book	128	Orion Children's Group		ISBN 0753817683, 978-1-842-55737-2
13 October 2011	Kindle edition	128	Amazon Kindle (via Orion)		ISBN 1908285079, 978-1-908-28507-2

== Reception ==
To add to the previous praise from the previous book series, Grizzly Tales: Cautionary Tales for Lovers of Squeam! received critical and audience acclaim. Jennifer Taylor for The Bookseller wrote that the reboot books are perfect for children who enjoyed the Horrid Henry books, and The Daily Express wrote that "No house of children should be without one of these."
