= Ghostly Tales for Ghastly Kids =

1992 short story collection by Jamie Rix

- First edition
- Author: Jamie Rix
- Audio read by: Andrew Sachs (1996)
- Illustrator: Bobbie Spargo
- Cover artist: Bobbie Spargo; etc.
- Language: English
- Series: Grizzly Tales for Gruesome Kids
- Release number: 2
- Genre: Children's horror
- Publisher: André Deutsch Limited; etc.
- Publication date: 14 February 1992
- Publication place: United Kingdom
- Media type: Print (Hardback)
- Pages: 144 (first edition)
- ISBN: 9780590540049
- Preceded by: Grizzly Tales for Gruesome Kids
- Followed by: Fearsome Tales for Fiendish Kids
- Went out of print c. 2010

Ghostly Tales for Ghastly Kids is a 1992 children's fantasy horror book of cautionary tales written by British author Jamie Rix and is the second book in the Grizzly Tales for Gruesome Kids series. It was published by André Deutsch and contains 15 short stories.

== Synopsis ==
=== Grandmother's Footsteps ===
The narrator cannot sleep because a long-fingernailed, messy-haired figure (presumably a man) is tormenting him outside of his window, promising to take him on a magic carpet ride to a magical breadstick land if he opens the window. Terrified, the narrator calls for his grandmother and tells her everything. They listen to the man's tapping outside and Grandma decides to distract the narrator with a ghost story. The story is about a boy named Jolyon, who is reading a book in his bedroom when he hears loud tapping from outside, which becomes faster and faster. He pulls his duvet over his head and watches the silhouette of a giant hand tap the window and smash the glass. He screamed in fear and his grandmother ran into the room, armed with a bedpan. The end.

The narrator is annoyed because Grandma promised a ghost would appear. Grandma explains that the tapping came from the branches of the apple tree moving in the wind and the storm caused the branch to break the window. As for the ghost, she says, "Here I am!" She walks towards the door, stops to take off her head, and disappears; outside, footsteps are heard fading away. The narrator does not sleep for a week.

=== Burgers ===
Burgerskip is the most successful fast food chain in the world, particularly in the UK. At the end of every school day, children of all ages race out of school to meet with friends and grab their dinner at the Burgerskip in Crawley High Street, as the chain's mascot — a clown — watched over them. The clown is based on Burgerskip's CEO, Seamus O'Burger, who is planning to expand his fast-food empire even further as his helicopter team escorts him to the Amazon rainforest. O'Burger wants parts of it bulldozed so there will be more space for farmland, after his pilot suggests it to him. The next day, O'Burger leads a team of bulldozers through the forest, pushing over trees and pulling up flowers. O'Burger's Amazon guide realises the extent of his tourist's plans and begs him at break time not to cut any further. O'Burger ignores him as he eats his breakfast burger and orders the bulldozing team to continue. The guide refers to the tree opposite them, explaining the Amazonian tribes respect it as a deity named Panachek, the "heart and soul" of the rainforest. O'Burger notices that the team have become hesitant to follow his orders and cuts Panachek down with a chainsaw. Everyone and everything in the rest of the rainforest watches in mournful silence as the tree tips over dead and O'Burger stands triumphant.

The chain becomes so successful Burgerskip begins running out of supplies. O'Burger spends a lot of time with his helicopter team to travel around the world for more farmland space, whether forests have to be bulldozed or not. Meanwhile, in the UK, a little girl named Charlotte visits Crawley High Street's Burgerskip with her father. She orders a Jolly Burger with chips and takes a bite outside. She splutters and chokes and shows her father a tiny mahogany tree inside it. The news of the burger reaches Burgerskip headquarters and to O'Burger, who redirects the plane to make an emergency meeting with the board of directors. Terrified of disappointing their boss, the directors are hesitant to speak up but one stammers that similar tree burger complaints have reached their headquarters. The tour guide from the Amazonia enters the room and refers to outside the window. O'Burger looks out to see hundreds of Burgerskip buildings suspended in the air by 300 ft (91 m) trees. The tour guide explains that this is a part of Panachek's revenge for destroying the Amazon and that he is not finished with O'Burger yet. O'Burger jumps on the guide and attempts to strangle him but the boardroom starts to shake. The ghost of Panachek bursts through the floor, picks up O'Burger and shoots up into the sky.

An epilogue reveals that this was the last time O'Burger was seen alive and Burgerskip was ever successful. An Australian farmer later found a part of O'Burger's clown costume but the claim lacked evidence. The UK becomes the new rainforest where roasted parrot became a popular meal.

=== Tag ===
One day, a boy in Terry Blotch's class arrives at school with a giant marble given to him from a Scottish grandmother for his birthday, which everyone on the playground gathers around to admire. Terry envies his friend's sudden popularity and is determined to make him cry. He sneaks into the classroom and steals a ring from the classmate's desk. This envy triggers a need for Terry to steal and he begins to shoplift from many stores, stealing a variety of items, and stealing from the streets, notably a dog. While hiding in a locker in an empty school changing room, Terry notices a sports bag containing a football kit belonging to "A. Phantom", according to the name tags. Terry snatches the kit, puts it on and leaves, and wears it for the rest of the day.

At home, the name tags cause blemishing rashes that would itch all over. By the next morning, Terry's face is covered in boils. His mother telephones for an emergency home doctor, who recommends he avoids eating junk food and to have a bath, assuming it is acne (although he admits he has no idea whether his hypothesis was accurate). Terry's mother suggests it is chickenpox when she notices the boils had spread all over her son's body but Terry knew no one who may have had the disease. "It's that football kit!" his mother cries and runs out of the bathroom. In bed days later, the boils begin to itch and Terry cannot resist scratching them. Each scratched boil explodes, covering his bedroom floor with thick pus, making him howl in pain. His mother rushes in, falling in the pus and gasps: her son's boils had disappeared and he had 1019 "A. Phantom" name tags sticking out of his body. The biggest (the 1020th) hung from the back of his neck which read "Thief". She tries to remove the tags with scissors but the name tags immediately regrow whenever she successfully cut them off. She demands to know what is going on so Terry reluctantly tells her about his secret shoplifting addiction.

Terry returns to school the next day, still covered with name tags. He sneaks into the changing room and puts the sports bag on the hook he stole it from and rushes out. The name tags disappear by lunchtime apart from "Thief", which soon falls off after a few days. Terry never steals again — the slightest itch will remind him of his humiliation, whenever he has a potential shoplifting opportunity — however, he has started getting lots of acne that is hard to get rid of.

=== The Locked Door ===
Somewhere in an unspecified country is a house with a locked door that has not been opened in 75 years. Every midnight, blood trickles from a lightbulb, and screams for help and heavy thumps can be heard by anyone coincidentally awake. Many people who once lived alone in the house were found dead days later. It is bought by Matt and Jody, two deaf newly-weds from New Zealand, who give birth to a daughter they name Rosie. Rosie is not deaf and is fascinated by the mysterious locked door her parents refuse to open. One night, she disappears. The parents searched every creepy room of the house until the locked door is the only option. Matt kicks the door but the force makes the ceiling collapse in front of him. He looks up and sees baby Rosie looking through the hole back at him. From that evening, no one is allowed to go to the loft.

That has been three years ago, but Rosie suffers from nightmares since, and will wake up to the locked door's midnight sounds frequently. This, and being banned from the floor above, only fuels Rosie's curiosity even more. One midnight, Rosie wakes up to scratching and investigates her bedroom's fireplace. Dust shoots out and a voice begs for help; Rosie runs out of the room towards the locked door. A pale hand appears under the door with a key as a voice begs her to let them free. Rosie takes the key and unlocks it. Inside is an axe, broken furniture and wood. An old man with a long beard is standing behind her and thanks her. Rosie takes him to meet her parents and lets him eat sponge cake; Matt and Jody are expectantly shocked, and are surprised they can hear his voice. The old man explains he has been locked in the room for years and has spent nights chopping firewood, occasionally cutting his hand. He is most likely 115 years old. Rosie jumps into his lap and lands on the wooden chair.

=== A Tangled Web ===
Nigel has a passion for torturing spiders, and a habit of clicking his tongue and daydreaming with his mouth open. He nicknames himself "Black Nigel" and will declare himself the spider that spiders fear, confusing (and sometimes annoying) his parents. One day, Ariadne, a pregnant spider, rushes into his bedroom to prepare for her labour. She runs towards the wardrobe to make a web at the top. Nigel hears her tiny footsteps and waits, picking up the jar he hides under his pillow. When Ariadne spins her web, Nigel swipes the jar across it, trapping her. Nigel screws the lid on and holds the jar against a candle flame, burning the spider alive. He dumps the corpse into a bin outside his window the bin men empty the next morning. At the landfill, the ghosts of the unborn babies are "born" and allow the wind to carry them through the town.

After Nigel is sent to bed for irritating his parents again, the spider ghosts float through his open bedroom window and into his open mouth. Hours later, Nigel wakes up with a tight chest as if he has a severe cold; through the night, the vengeful spider ghosts spin webs around his ribcage. Nigel coughs up a spider but only spots it after it had run across the bedsheets, only realising it came from him when he coughs up another. Nigel never opens his mouth again and he never does. He now spends a lot of free time knitting. He has no idea why he always knits webs as big as his bedroom. It is just instinct.

=== The Well ===
Mr and Mrs Halley live in Wellsdeep cottage in Devon, which has an 1100-year-old well at the bottom of the garden, with a 144 feet (44 m) bottom. Mrs Halley wants her husband to cover the well before their two grandsons (Louis and Ben) arrive, who put their hands anywhere. In the morning, Mr Halley promises to do block it but by the afternoon, the boys arrive and the well is not covered. "I'll do it tomorrow," says Mr Halley when his wife confronts him. That night, Mr Halley feels tiny hands tickling his feet and touching his eyelids as he sleeps. He jumps out of bed and opens the curtains, and hears laughter coming from the well. He loudly vows to cover it before his wife reminds him that he is not wearing his pyjamas. At sunrise, Mr Halley races to the well with measuring tape and a pencil but the tape falls down the well before he can read the measurement of the diameter. He has a tantrum, throws his hat after the tape, and tells his wife he will fix the well tomorrow with better equipment. At lunchtime, Louis and Ben run to the well to play Pirates; Louis sits in the well's bucket to imitate the crow's nest and Ben holds the rope. Mrs Halley runs to the well to stop them as Ben lets go, and grabs the rope before the bucket dropped too far. Mr Halley (who had been asleep inside throughout the incident) is woken up by his wife angrily pouring water over him and splutters that he will fix the well tomorrow.

That night, Mr Halley is woken up by the tiny hands and laughter again. He opens the curtains to see a full moon's light making the well glow. He spots a tiny person run out of the back door and jump into the well. He rushes out to the garden with a torch and searches the inside, seeing neither of his grandsons at the bottom. A force pushes him, and he lands in the water. He crawls onto a ledge above and calls for help. A little boy climbs out of the water and joins him, introducing himself as The Ghost of Jobs Left Undone, pointing out that the well should have been blocked already. Mr Halley adamantly claims that he was going to do it and the ghost replies that his grandfather had said the same but never kept his promise, which caused his death. Ben and Louis appear at the top, preparing to rescue their grandfather. Mr Halley orders them to not move but they climb into the bucket. The rope snaps and the boys fall into the water.

Mr Halley wakes up in his bedroom, soaking wet and screaming. Before the grandsons woke up, he blocked the well as best as he could. Mrs Halley is pleased and suggests he paints the outside of the house like he promised. Mr Halley tells her he will do that tomorrow.

=== An Elephant Never Forgets ===
The upper-middle-class Crumpdump family are driving their Rolls-Royce car through the African wilderness on a safari, impatient to see elephants. They eventually find a herd and the children, Belinda and Percy, become excited. "I want one!" demands Percy. Mrs Crumpdump is against it because a living one would destroy the house and a dead one would stink but Mr Crumpdump remains quiet, hiding his smirk. After the family returns home, a parcel is delivered one breakfast later, containing an elephant's foot. The children are disturbed as Mr Crumpdump proudly explains that he had someone trophy hunt for him but they move the foot towards the door by the leopard skin rug to use as an umbrella stand.

One rainy day, before a trip to the shoe shop, Belinda says aloud that she wishes the rain would stop as she takes her umbrella from the elephant's foot. The rain stops and the sun appears in the sky. Percy becomes excited and grabs the foot, wishing to be 20 feet (6.1 m) tall. He grows through the ceiling and then wishes himself back to normal size. The children start to love their magical umbrella stand, making their schoolfriends jealous, and wish for several things every day until the mansion is almost full. They also used it to be lazy: Percy wishes he could go to bed without having a bath and the prepared bathwater dried up, whereas Belinda wishes for an excuse to not go to school, making it burn down. However, because Belinda and Percy are spoilt children who already have many toys and games, they are never satisfied with the things they wish for. After running out of ideas, Belinda suggests they should wish for the elephant they wanted and does so, despite Percy's hesitance. A bleeding, three-legged baby elephant limps across the landing towards the stairs. Percy orders his sister to wish it away but Belinda is too scared; the elephant rolls down the stairs and crushes them.

Mr and Mrs Crumpdump return home to find a broken staircase, a dirty carpet and the umbrella stand missing (the story writes that it has been stolen). Every night since, the ghosts of their children cry for the elephant's forgiveness. Their parents cannot take another sleepless night and file for divorce.

=== School Dinners ===
The narrator has always had a bad relationship with food. It began at lunchtimes during school when the horrible school dinners will be served: unspecified pork fat, cauliflower, prunes, stewed peas, lumpy and cold rice pudding, and Pork rind, to name a few. The school dinner lady would patrol the aisles and openly scold any students that are avoiding certain parts of their plate. Once, she yells at the narrator to eat his cold and maggot-infested kedgeree so hard, her spittle sprays it but he still has to eat every mouthful. One student she never has to ask twice is Elgin (nicknamed Blue Bottle by the rest of the school), who worships her and the dinners. After cleaning his plate, he would crawl under the tables and eat off the floor and then go to the bin full of leftovers and eat its contents as well, as the rest of the school tried not to retch. The narrator never got sympathy from his parents, who would call him ungrateful and selfish because there are children his age in the world who never get a chance to choose, let alone eat. The dinner lady would stalk the narrator to check he swallowed everything and even followed him into the boys' toilets. Eventually, the narrator's parents agreed to send in a medical note to excuse him from eating school dinners but the dinner lady made him eat it instead.

Lunchtimes at school traumatised the narrator. He had nightmares about talking food begging to be eaten and frequently had flashbacks whenever he smelt food the dinner lady had forced him to eat or Elgin had ate out of the bin or off the floor. His first panic attack was when he was 22: in a lift, he smelt spotted dick, which made him belch and his stomach churn loudly; he felt spotted dick appear in his mouth and gagged as he forced himself to swallow it. If he ever smelt baked beans being cooked, he would crawl under the nearest table and scream; tomato ketchup and carrots were two of his many trauma triggers. His worst panic attack ever was the day he took a girlfriend to a sophisticated French restaurant for a candlelit dinner. He ordered the unspecified £125-for-two special with champagne, which the head waiter brought over, removing the lid to reveal fishcakes. The narrator screamed and covered himself with the tablecloth, accidentally spraying champagne over his girlfriend, making her leave in embarrassment and the other guests watch the commotion. In the narrator's mind, the head waiter had shape-shifted into the school dinner lady, who demands he eats the cakes whilst trying to force feed him from a spoon. He kicks and screams and fights back, returning from his daze outside of the restaurant with fish cake around his mouth.

The narrator points out that was a long time ago and he is about to turn 83 next week. He admits nothing had changed, spending the rest of his life isolating himself from friends and family, and tries not to look at any advertising for food that used to torture him. Unfortunately, he is about to be moved into a retirement home within the next few days which has a scarily-familiar-looking dinner lady who had promised to monitor his diet.

=== The Big Sleep ===
A father is talking to his son as he tucks him in bed. The son asks whether his father could tell whether he was still in a dream. The father replies that he wakes up and just knows but the son continuously repeats the question. The father gives up with a vague answer of "just knowing" because dreams are too ridiculous to be realistic. Then he unscrews his tail and jumps down to the floor, sings a lullaby out of a navel, screwed his teeth in, kisses his son with one of eight lips and put a sausage in his ear to turn off the bedroom light.

=== Bogman ===
Helen loves going to the toilet but only to escape her parents' rules. The complicated back of the toilet allows Helen to hide her comic books from her family's clutches so that her "weak bladder" excuses are more convincing. One morning, her mother orders her to clean up after breakfast and Helen starts to "feel" cramps. Her mother threatens that if she disobeyed, The Bogman will come for her. When she returns home from school hours later, Helen asks her father who The Bogman is. He explains as he prepares the family's dinner that six months ago, a skeletal bog body from the Stone Age had been discovered under the drainage of their house and is said to have come to life at times to look for the people that had drowned him in a bog.

At dinner, Helen's parents are adamant she washes everyone's dishes. Luckily, her father falls asleep and Helen sneaks away as her mother snaps at him. On the toilet, Helen hears clattering noises, assuming she had called her mother's bluff but the clattering becomes louder and she hears footsteps inside the toilet. A thunderstorm appears in the ceiling and she smells rotting wood as a voice wails for vengeance. A skeleton's hand shoots out of the toilet and grabs Helen, making the toilet break off the hinges. In the kitchen, liquidated peat pours out of the taps and floods the room until it wakes Helen's father up. The Bogman skeleton introduces himself as Marg and accuses Helen's family of killing him. Helen frantically denies it as the skeleton pulls her towards the toilet. Her parents burst into the room as her brother Damian runs to his room for cover. Helen throws a comic to her father, who rolls it and strikes Marg, turning it into a spear. Marg disintegrates into dust and the thunder clouds disappear, leaving the messy kitchen and the wrecked toilet behind. It would take three weeks for the house to be cleaned and fixed, and the epilogue notes that Helen would do the most work. Meanwhile, Marg's disintegrated remains are gathered in a bin bag with peat and dumped in the local landfill, but it is likely that Marg might return someday.

=== The Broken-Down Cottage ===
Augustus Filch hates: going to school, his parents, his friends (although the feeling was ironically mutual), and his boring life. Wanting a fresh start, he steals money from his mother's purse and rides the bus into the countryside. After making his way through the creepy woods, he finds an old, abandoned cottage named Dun' Inn and sneaks inside. Downstairs looked old and empty apart from a rocking chair by a working fireplace. A boy is there and introduces himself as Arthur, who had run away from his home as well, many years ago. They share biscuits and Augustus' stolen snacks and decide to prank call.

They phone the police and claim armed burglars had broken in. Several officers with dogs arrive minutes later and find the two boys cackling and no burglars. The chief of police warns them of crying wolf as he orders the rest of his team out. The next prank call victims are the ambulance service, who arrived minutes later, looking for a boy in shock. Augustus is lying on his back trying to hide his smirk as Arthur acts concerned, but then the two boys begin to laugh, and the ambulance team leave furious with a warning similar to the police chiefs, but Arthur had already grabbed the telephone to call the fire department. The firefighters also arrive and then leave furious, leaving the boys laughing until their sides hurt. After gaining their composure, Arthur and Augustus fall asleep in front of the fireplace.

The next day, the boys wake up feeling cold. Arthur suggests doing another prank call, but Augustus has lost interest, telephoning his parents to take him home instead. His parents arrive much later to see a burnt Dun' Inn surrounded by the local fire brigade, ambulances and the police. The chief of police tells them his theory that the house burnt down approximately overnight, due to the open fireplace inside. Confused and concerned, Augustus' mother says her son was inside and wanted her and his father to collect him because he and a boy he met were traumatised from seeing ghosts; "Sounds like him," the chief of police mumbled to himself. Augustus' parents eventually enter Dun' Inn and find Augustus and the other boy unharmed and looking relaxed. Augustus' parents are relieved he and Arthur are fine, but Augustus' mother asks if they remembered what the ghosts looked like. The boys reply that the ghosts looked like them, then turn around and walk through the wall.

=== Guilt Ghost ===
A man went to a bar and had a bar brawl with another customer. He punched the customer, who falls to their death, and ran away until he is far enough to not be recognised. Now fully anonymous, he buys a house to start a new life and forget about the accident. One day, he hears a voice whispering about the customer's death; he shushes it. It is the voice of a tiny ghost behind his ear, which whispers that it will not disappear until the man confesses. When the police appear at the front door to ask questions about the bar death, the ghost gives snide commentary as the officer shows off the victim's photograph. The man denies he ever saw and/or met the customer. The ghost grows to the size of a parrot and sits on the man's shoulder.

The man struggles to sleep as the parrot-sized ghost never moves from his shoulder and continues reminding him about his lies. The police officer returns sometime later with the scarf the man had worn on the night of the bar brawl. Despite the officer pointing out the DNA all over it, the man denies being at the bar and/or being involved with any altercations. The parrot-sized ghost jumps off his shoulder and turns into a talking alligator. This version of the ghost never leaves the man's side and never shuts up, purposely circling the man's feet when he walks to trip him up and making him stubborn and rude in front of others from the frustration, losing any chance at beginning friendships or a romantic life.

The police officer returns to the house with another officer. The man is drowsy and irritable, with a face full of stubble, exhausted from the alligator ghost's recent, week-long monologuing. The officers reveal they are here to arrest him because the autopsy and forensic evidence finds him the culprit but the man still denies he was ever involved with the bar patron's death. The alligator rolls itself into the corner of the room and begins to shape-shift again, growing a pinkish texture, turning into a man, and claims he is the actual killer; he is arrested and escorted out of the house. The man is confused but delighted his ghost took the blame. He walks into his kitchen to take out beer to celebrate but his hand slides through the handle of the fridge, discovering he has switched places with his guilt ghost.

=== A Lesson From History ===
Elisa joins the queue outside a school hall where her history exam is due to take place any minute. She hates history lessons and has no motivation to prepare for any tests so she stands worried next to the rest of the students, who are firing miscellaneous questions at each other about a variety of history topics. Miss Panine de Burm the monitoring teacher allows the girls inside and everyone sits at their assigned desks. When the exam begins, Elisa is the only student not writing and fidgets with her pen until she has ink all over her tongue. She hears a voice call her name but everyone is distracted with their papers. Elisa assumes she imagined the voice until the ghost of a little girl wearing a pinafore approaches her. The ghost girl is named Penny and explains she was a student here 100 years ago who died when the school caught fire during her History exam. As History exams during this time of year is a school tradition, she always returns to haunt it ever since. Miss de Burm marches through the aisles to confront Elisa for talking. As she warns her, Penny dances around and does loud, distracting things, showing that only Elisa can see her.

Elisa realises she has no need to worry about her exam now that someone who had haunted the school for a century was talking to her. Penny agrees to do the exam, picks up the pen and starts answering the questions as Elisa relaxes in her chair. After the writing is finished, the ghost girl says goodbye and walks out the hall through the fire exit door. On Results Day, the history class gather in front of a bulletin board poster full of everyone's grades, ordered from best to worst by percentage. Rachel, best friend and the student Elisa envied the most, is expectantly at the top of the list with 98% whereas Elisa is shocked to discover she is at the bottom with 0%. The last paragraph of the story points out Elisa never considered asking Penny if she had paid attention to the world around her during her haunting, or whether she had been a studiously diligent student when she was alive.

=== The Ghost of Christmas Turkeys Past ===
Jack loves eating turkey for every meal. His parents loathe the lack of variety but Jack can detect whenever his mother attempts to sneak different but similar-looking meat into her shopping basket. Jack enjoys turkey enough to go on holidays to Greece to see the world's best turkeys. Determined to end his son's turkey obsession for good, on Christmas Eve, Jack's father climbs the roof of a neighbour's house and waits for Father Christmas. Eventually, Father Christmas arrives on his sleigh, crashing into the roof at the shock of seeing a man sitting on it. Jack's father interrupts the magical old man's rant to explain why he caused the distraction. Father Christmas is disappointed because he loves turkey as much as Jack but reluctantly uses his Christmas magic.

Jack wakes up to see a one-legged talking chicken in his bedroom. It introduces itself as the Ghost of Christmas Turkeys Past and flies Jack to an empty field. It shows Jack a retirement home for unused turkeys, showing elderly anthropomorphic turkeys looking exhausted and miserable. It points out how turkey is wasted throughout holiday seasons and then neglected when it does not live up to expectations, adding that it caused his leg to disappear. Jack points out that he still loves eating turkey as turkey bones rain over him for 20 minutes. Another turkey appears, dressed as an army general: The Ghost of Christmas Turkeys Present. It takes Jack to a broiler room full of turkeys and explains how abusive and terrifying the poultry farming industry is for its species, especially during December. Jack begins to feel unwell from watching the turkeys suffering but admits that he still likes turkey regardless. In walks a turkey the size of a human dressed similarly to a hippie who takes Jack's hand and flies up to the outer atmosphere. Jack feels more queasy as the turkey circles the Earth a few times and lands in front of a house. The turkey explains that they have time-travelled 100 years into the future, to 2090. Jack looks through the window to see a family of anthropomorphic turkeys sitting down at a table for Christmas dinner. The mother walks in with a lid-covered plate and places it in the middle of the table as the excited family look on. The lid is removed to reveal Jack's cooked corpse.

It is the morning of Christmas Day when Jack wakes up screaming from his nightmare. At the inevitable Christmas dinner, Jack barely eats. His father (looking notably smug) points out that he does not immediately reach for a piece of turkey. Jack gathers some of the surrounding vegetables as he says that he is not in the mood today. His father looks up to the ceiling and silently prays his thanks to Father Christmas.

=== Rogues Gallery: The Seven Most Wanted Ghosts in Britain ===
This story is a list of the seven most-wanted ghosts in Britain. In order:

1. Old Hollow Legs (Case number 101X): Winner of the Greediest Ghost of Greenwich competition. He is a giant head on a pair of legs, who died ten years before due to unspecified reasons about a slice of chocolate fudge. He often steals from the living's fridges or waits under dinner tables to catch falling scraps;
2. Transparent Tony (Case number 102X): Tony causes people to lie badly, especially children. He whispers into targets' ears and the target repeats what they heard;
3. The Headless Coachman (Case number 103X): Similar to the Headless Horseman, the Coachman drives a horse-drawn coach and causes traffic jams on the M25;
4. The Bermuda Triangle (Case number 104X): A secret organisation full of the ghosts of 700 South American gangsters based in the sea. They frequently steal model boats and remote control planes from unsuspecting children;
5. Nostalgic Nora (Case number 105X): Nora possesses the elderly, causing them to talk about trivial things about their childhood for long periods of time;
6. The Immortal Remains of Henry Fink (Case number 106X): The smelly, disembowelled remains of Henry Fink, who was killed by an axe murderer in 1970, which scatter themselves around every house they haunt;
7. Smudger (Case number 107X): The reason why eaten food stains clothes and smears against lips and cheeks.

== Themes ==
Compared to the previous book in the series, the stories in Ghostly Tales for Ghastly Kids reflects the title consistently because ghosts appear as main characters, whether heroes or villains. They are frequently poltergeists that can act the same as they would when alive or they have magical powers ("Rogues Gallery", "Guilt Ghost", "The Ghost of Christmas Turkeys Past", "Tag"), and vary from turkey ghosts, child ghosts, and Judge A. Phantom Esq, who punishes stealing children. The first story, "Grandmother's Footsteps", used the phrase ghost story as word play because the plot twist of the grandmother being dead all along changed the phrase's meaning to "story from a ghost"; "A Lesson From History" uses wordplay for ghostwriter because a ghost wrote Elisa's exam. Meanwhile, "Guilt Ghost" and "The Broken-Down Cottage" end with the main character(s) discovering they had died. "The Big Sleep" is the only story not about or features ghosts.

There are also examples of ethical arguments on environmental issues: "An Elephant Never Forgets" uses the social class of the wealthy Crumpdump family to imply they have participated in trophy hunting occasionally, Mr Crumpdump boasting that he paid someone to kill a baby elephant for him, and his children leaving their present next to a rug made out of leopard skin in the hallway because they did not like the present, although they were prepared to have an entire elephant corpse. In "Burgers", Seamus' greed and desire to own the most successful restaurant in the world makes him deforest the Amazonia. "The Well", "A Lesson From History" and "Bogman" are stories about laziness: Elisa refuses to prepare for an exam in a lesson she loathes and then makes a ghost do the test for her, whereas "Bogman" and "The Well" are also about procrastination. "Tag" is about envy, which leads to kleptomania. "The Broken-Down Cottage" is the first story in the book series that is about the dangers of playing pranks, along with "Knock Down Ginger" and "The Gas Man Cometh" from More Grizzly Tales for Gruesome Kids, "Monty's Python" from Nasty Little Beasts, and "The Piranha Sisters" from Blubbers and Sicksters.

== Television adaptation ==
Only six stories were not adapted for the cartoon programmes: "The Well", "School Dinners", "The Big Sleep", "Guilt Ghost", "The Ghost of Christmas Turkeys Past", and "Rogues Gallery". Out of these six, "The Big Sleep" and "Rogues Gallery" are a short story and a list, respectively. It has not been explained why the rest were not adapted, however.

With the rest, there have been changes in the adaptations. For example:

- "Burgers"' episode was renamed as "Burgerskip" (Series 1, Episode 8), after the eponymous restaurant. Seamus was renamed as Oswald and dressed as a cowboy instead of a clown due to copyright reasons and in order not to get into legal troubles with McDonald's
- "Tag" (Series 2, Episode 9) changed the owner of the football kit from A. Phantom to Jim Spectre.
- "Bogman" (Series 4, Episode 5) changed the action of Helen throwing the comic book to her father to her brother Damien throwing the comic book to him instead. In the book, Damien had run to his bedroom to hide.
- "A Lesson From History" was adapted as the episode "The History Lesson" (Series 1, Episode 11). The main character was renamed Elizabeth from Elisa, which can be the full version of "Elisa".
- "An Elephant Never Forgets" changed minor details:
  - When Belinda wished the rain would stop, it is not mentioned that the family were going out to the shoe shop;
  - The rug that the umbrella stand is placed next to is tiger skin instead of leopard;
  - Percy wishes he was 10 feet (3.0 m) tall instead of twenty;
  - The children's wishes that get them out of school and having a nighttime bath are not included;
  - Mr and Mrs Crumpdump move out of their now-haunted mansion instead of divorcing.
  - The ghost of the Elephant calf is seen with its parents in Africa.

== Publication history ==
The original front cover was illustrated by Bobbie Spargo, who was also illustrator. Sue Heap illustrated the front cover in the 1995 edition, but Spargo's story illustrations were still included in the book (he only illustrated for "Rogues Gallery"). After the cartoon series aired on CITV, the covers were re-designed by Honeycomb Animation, the producers of the cartoon.

The book is said to have officially gone out of print in 2010. It was briefly available on Kindle in 2011, published by Orion.

| Pub. date | Format | No. of pages | Publisher | Notes | ISBN | Ref. |
|---|---|---|---|---|---|---|
| 14 February 1992 | Hardback | 144 | André Deutsch Ltd. | | ISBN 9780590540049 | |
| 20 October 1995 | Paperback (Mass Market) | 192 | Scholastic Inc. | Under Scholastic's (now defunct) Hippo children's book branding; Front cover illustrated by Sue Heap | ISBN 0590132423, 9780590132428 | |
| 1 January 1996 | Audio book (Cassette) | — | Chivers Audio Books | Read by Andrew Sachs | ISBN 0745124712, 9780745124711 | |
| 21 January 2000 | Paperback | 192 | Scholastic | Front cover designed by Honeycomb Animation | ISBN 043901445X, 9780439014458 | |
| 2011 | Kindle Edition | 86 | Orion Publishing | Self-published by Jamie Rix; "Tag" was not included; Seamus O'Burger from "Burgerskip" was renamed Roland Macburger | ASIN B00B8SNN1G (ISBN 978-1-908285-05-8) | |
| 24 January 2017 | Audio book | 2:48:27 | Audible | Audio from Chivers Audio Books | ISBN 1536641731, 9781536641738 | |
