= Jamie Rix =

British writer and television producer

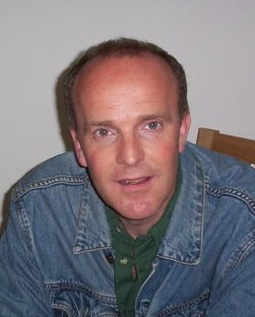
- Born: 27 April 1958 (age 68); England
- Education: University of Kent
- Occupations: author, producer, screenwriter
- Years active: 1981–present
- Known for: Grizzly Tales for Gruesome Kids; The War Diaires of Alistair Fury
- Spouse: Helen Murray (m. 1980)
- Children: 2
- Parents: Brian Rix (father); Elspet Gray (mother)
- Relatives: Louisa Rix (sister); Sheila Mercier (aunt); John Middleton Murry Jr. (father-in-law); John Middleton Murry (grandfather-in-law)
- Website: jamierix.com

Jamie Rix (born 27 April 1958) is an English children's author, television comedy writer, and media producer. He is best known for the book series Grizzly Tales for Gruesome Kids and The War Diaries of Alistair Fury; both were adapted into children's television programmes.

== Career ==
Rix studied Drama and English at the University of Kent, and worked as an assistant stage manager at Royal Court Theatre to learn how to direct plays. On holiday in France, he created a white lie story, The Spaghetti Man, in order to make his four-year-old son eat his dinner. It was about a little boy who refused to behave at the kitchen table and is kidnapped by an invisible force, that takes him to a factory to turn him into lasagne. Rix took note of how the lie had made his four-year-old eat all of his meals without hesitations, which would inspire a series that could scare children into behaving themselves.

The Spaghetti Man would be included in Rix debut book Grizzly Tales for Gruesome Kids, which was published in 1990 by André Deutsch. Its popularity led to a Smarties Prize Children's Choice Award and three sequels: Ghostly Tales for Ghastly Kids (1992), Fearsome Tales for Fiendish Kids (1996), and More Grizzly Tales for Gruesome Kids (2001), followed by a revived book series in 2007, now named Grizzly Tales: Cautionary Tales for Lovers of Squeam!. These were later adapted into two award-winning television animation series. He has written many books for many age groups, such as Johnny Casanova – the Unstoppable Sex Machine for older readers, and The Revenge Files of Alistair Fury, originally called The War Diaries of Alistair Fury, an account of an eleven-year-old boy desperate for revenge on his older brother and sister. The series was adapted into a successful CBBC series, which won a BAFTA in 2008.

Rix was hired by the BBC to write and produce comedy, such as Radio Active, The Michael Bentine Show, The Wow Show, and The History of Rock for BBC Radio 4, and, for television, Alas Smith and Jones.

=== Little Brother Productions ===
In 1994, Rix founded a production company with Nigel Planer, at the time named Elephant Productions. It produced the two book-to-TV adaptations of Rix's bibliography, as well as the children's programmes Animal School and Popskool for the BBC, Father Christmas, and the 2005 Willo the Wisp revival for Playhouse Disney, and the adult programmes Not Going Out, Faith in the Future, and Let's Get Divorced with Jonathan and Libby Hughes.

== Personal life ==
Jamie Rix is the son of actor-turned-Mencap President Brian Rix and actress Elspet Gray, and was raised in Richmond Park with his two older sisters (one of them being Louisa) and younger brother. Rix admitted that Alistair Fury's odd relationship with his bullying siblings were based on the arguments he used to have with his siblings during childhood. As a child he was involved with sports: he had a football trial with Chelsea FC and ran marathons until he hurt his back. At school, an English teacher inspired him to write fiction.

Rix married BBC secretary Helen Murray in 1980. They have two sons and live in Tooting, London. His aunt is Sheila Mercier, who portrayed Annie Sugden in the soap opera Emmerdale. He is the son-in-law of John Middleton Murry Jr. and the grandson-in-law of John Middleton Murry.
