= Vicariousness =

When one experiences another person's life through imaginative participation

Vicariousness refers to qualities or scenarios wherein one experiences another person's life, through imaginative or sympathetic participation.

There are various examples whereby the social phenomenon of vicariousness may be observed. These include for instance, stage parents, some of whom may try to live out their dream career through their offspring. Such attempts of vicarious behavior has been noted by some analysts as having negative consequences. In actual circumstances wherein a parent tries to live out their accomplishment through their child even though the child seems uninterested, it has been labeled with common phrases such as chasing lost dreams. In these instances, it is a subset of possessiveness which has been most markedly observed at the spectator stands of children's sport games. There are some idioms wherein vicariousness is viewed favorably, such as put oneself in another's shoes.

== See also ==
- Helicopter parent
