= Little Red Riding Hood (disambiguation) =

Little Red Riding Hood is a folk tale character.

Little Red Riding Hood may also refer to:

== Film ==
- Little Red Riding Hood (1911 film), an American film starring Mary Pickford - see Mary Pickford filmography
- Little Red Riding Hood (1918 film), an American fantasy film directed by Otis B. Thayer
- Little Red Riding Hood (1920 film), silent Czech film
- Little Red Riding Hood (1922 film), a Disney animated short film
- Little Red Riding Hood (1953 film), a German film directed by Fritz Genschow
- Little Red Riding Hood (1954 film), a German live-action film directed by Walter Janssen
- Little Red Riding Hood (1997 film), a 1997 short
- Little Red Riding Hood (2022 film), a Russian film
- Little Red Riding Hood (Shrek), a character in the Shrek franchise

== Music ==
- Little Red Riding Hood (album), by Lost Dogs
- Little Red Riding Hood (musical), a 1899 musical by George T. Richardson
- Little Red Riding Hood (opera), a 1911 opera by César Cui
- Little Red Riding Hood (1958 song), released as a B-side by The Big Bopper.

== Other uses ==
- "Little Red Riding Hood" (Faerie Tale Theatre episode)
- Little Red Riding Hood (Pinkney book), a 2007 children's picture book by Jerry Pinkney.

== See also ==
- Adaptations of Little Red Riding Hood
- "Li'l Red Riding Hood", a 1966 song recorded by Sam the Sham and the Pharaohs
- "Little Red Riding Hood and the Wolf", a title given to No. 6 of Rachmaninoff's Op. 39 Études-Tableaux
- Dizzy Red Riding Hood, a 1931 Talkartoons cartoon directed by Dave Fleischer
- Little Red Walking Hood, a 1937 Merrie Melodies cartoon directed by Tex Avery
- Little Rural Riding Hood, a 1949 MGM cartoon directed by Tex Avery
- Little Red Rodent Hood, a 1952 Merrie Melodies directed by Friz Freleng
- Red Riding Hood (disambiguation)
