= Adaptations of Little Red Riding Hood =

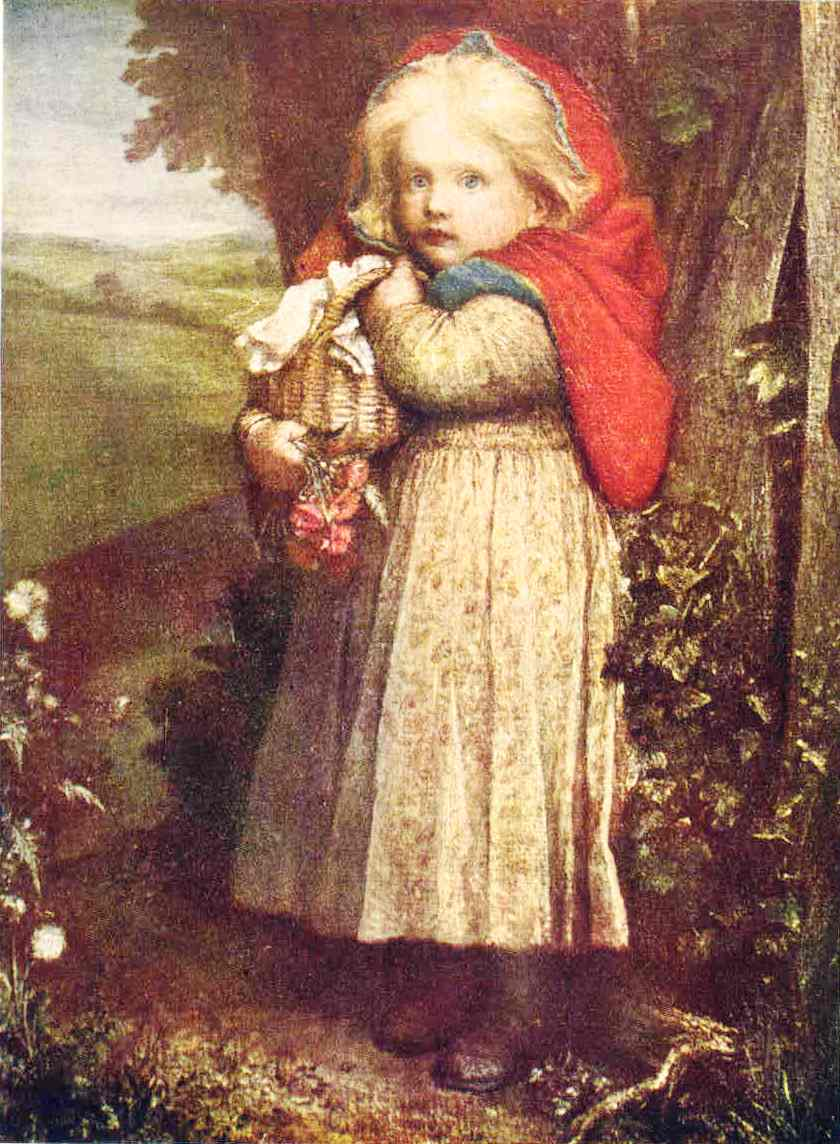
Red Riding Hood by George Frederic Watts

The Little Red Riding Hood fairy tale has often been adapted, and into a wide variety of media.

== Animation ==
Little Red Riding Hood (1922)

- Walt Disney produced a black-and-white silent short cartoon called "Little Red Riding Hood" (1922) for Laugh-O-Gram Cartoons. Copies of this early work of Disney's are extremely rare.
- British animator Anson Dyer produced a silent short cartoon called Little Red Riding Hood (1922) as part of his Kiddie-Graphs series of animated fairy tales.
- Van Beuren Studios produced a black-and-white cartoon called "Red Riding Hood" (1931) in which the Grandma drinks "Jazz Tonic" that de-ages her into her younger self. The Wolf and the younger Grandma intend to elope, but are thwarted by the Wolf's wife and children during the ceremony.
- The Fleischer Brothers produced the theatrical short "Dizzy Red Riding Hood" (1931), featuring Betty Boop and Bimbo, in which Bimbo defeats the wolf on the way to Grandma's house, and puts on the wolf's skin to pursue Betty, while Grandma has gone out to the Firemen's Ball.
- Tex Avery's Red Hot Riding Hood (1943) recasts the story in an adult-oriented urban setting, with the suave, suited wolf howling after the night club singer Red.
- Tex Avery also utilized the same cast and themes in a number of other cartoons in this series, such as Little Rural Riding Hood (1949), which set the story in the modern day and featured Red and the wolf as hillbillies.
- Early Bugs Bunny cartoons, such as Little Red Riding Rabbit (1944), utilize characters from fairy tales such as Little Red Riding Hood. In one cartoon comic version, Red Riding Hoodwinked (1955), Little Red Riding Hood is accompanied by Tweety Bird while the villains are played by a Wolf and Sylvester, who almost come to blows over who is going to play "Grandma".
- Another Sylvester parody is Little Red Rodent Hood (1952).
- A few Loopy de Loop cartoons such as "Tale of a Wolf" feature Little Red Riding Hood.
- Jay Ward's Fractured Fairy Tales had a few spoofs of the tale, one of which involved a basket that exploded just before the bearer could say "goodies".
- Goldilocks and the Three Bears/Rumpelstiltskin/Little Red Riding Hood/Sleeping Beauty (1984), animated direct-to-video featurette produced by Lee Mendelson Film Productions.
- My Favorite Fairy Tales (Sekai Dōwa Anime Zenshū) (1986), an anime television anthology, has a 12-minute adaptation.
- The anime television series Grimm's Fairy Tale Classics (1987) features Little Red Riding Hood in one episode.
- The Japanese children's anime television series Akazukin Chacha features the eponymous heroine Chacha who is visually reminiscent of Little Red Riding Hood ('akazukin' relates to her red hood and cape). One of the major themes of the series is a sort of pre-adolescent love triangle between Chacha and her two male friends, one of whom is a werewolf, the other a boy-witch.
- Jetlag Productions' animated film Little Red Riding Hood (1995) adapts the classic fairy tale and at the same time adds its own original twists and additions to the story to stretch the plotline to their regular 48-minute length. The film features three original songs, and was written by George Bloom and produced by Mark Taylor.
- Jan Kounen directed Le dernier chaperon rouge (1996; The Last Riding Hood, literal translation), a French fantasy musical short film starring Emmanuelle Béart.
- Disney Television Animation released Redux Riding Hood (1997), a re-imagining of the ending where the wolf is so traumatized by the failure to catch Little Red Riding Hood that he builds a time machine to go back in time and finish the deed with his past self. The film was nominated for an Academy Award, but lost the award and was shelved by Disney for 14 years before director Steve Moore uploaded the video on YouTube.
- The Japanese animated film Jin-Roh (1999; also known as Jin-Roh: The Wolf Brigade), about a secret society within an anti-terrorist unit of an alternative post-World War II Japan, makes several literary and visual references to the German oral version of the story (most notably a Rotkäppchen book offered to the main character by one of the female bomb couriers), which is closer to the Perrault version, than the tale of Grimm, with an anti-terrorist commando as the wolf (the title is literally "Man-wolf" in Japanese"), and a former terrorist courier as the young lady.
- The Simsala Grimm version of the story is more faithful to the original source material, except the wolf has a lice in his fur and introduces himself as the marquis to Little Red Riding Hood. After she and her grandmother are out, the hunter ties him up instead of putting stones in the stomach.
- The main character of the anime Otogi Jushi Akazukin is a girl named Akazukin, who is a Fairy Musketeer and has to protect a boy named Souta, who's the Elde Key, from the world of Science. Akazukin comes from Fandavale, the world of Magic, and to protect Souta, she has the help of Val, her Wolf Familiar and the other two Musketeers, Shirayuki (Snow White) and Ibara (Sleeping Beauty). The enemies are Randagio (one of the Bremen Town Musicians), Hansel and Gretel, who work for Cinderella, who wants the Elde's Key.
- The animated children's film, Hoodwinked! (2005), uses the anachronistic parody approach to the tale typified by the Shrek films, envisioning the story as a Rashomon-like mystery in which the anthropomorphised animal police of the forest question the four participants of the story after they are detained for an apparent domestic disturbance that the police suspect is tied to the mysterious "Goodie Bandit", a thief who has been stealing sweet shop store owners' books. One by one, each character is interviewed and explains to the police their story of how they got to Granny's house and why, and each story is followed by a lengthy flashback. All four characters are discovered to not quite be what they initially appear to be, and all of their stories overlap with each other:
  - Red Puckett is a worldly wise delivery girl, who gets her name from the red hooded cloak she wears. She is determined to protect her Granny's recipe book after someone breaks into Granny's store.
  - Granny Puckett secretly lives a double life as an extreme sports athlete named "Triple G". She participates in a ski race and is nearly killed by the Bandit's henchmen. After incapacitating them by staging an avalanche, she ends up bound and gagged in her own closet when the parachute and ripcord she uses to escape get caught in her ceiling fan after she comes down the chimney.
  - The Wolf (full name Wolf W. Wolf) is an investigative journalist. He and his assistant, a hyperactive squirrel named Twitchy, think that Red is somehow involved in the Goodie Bandit thefts.
  - Kirk Kirkkendall, the woodsman, is not a lumberjack, but an out-of-work actor who spends his days selling schnitzel out of a truck and has just been auditioned for a foot ointment commercial. After someone raids and he cannibalizes his truck, he starts cutting down trees with an axe to try to get into the shoes of a woodsman. He is accidentally thrown through Granny's cottage window after trying to cut down a very large tree.
- In the film Shrek the Third (2007), Little Red Riding Hood is portrayed as one of the villainesses; she is seen pick pocketing in one scene during Prince Charming's pillage. The Big Bad Wolf is considered one of the good guys.
- "Red Riding Hood" is a character in Super Why! (2007), in which she calls herself "Wonder Red," wears roller blades, and has "Word Power".
- The anime Okami-san and her Seven Companions (2010) is based around the characters Ryōko Ōkami (Ōkami meaning wolf), Ryōshi Morino (his name also meaning "The Forest's Hunter" in Japanese) and Ringo Akai (representing Little Red Riding Hood) and the rest of the "trading" club named the "Otogi High School Bank" as they fix students' problems, whatever they may be, in exchange for the students helping them out later. Almost all of the characters in the anime are based on characters from Little Red Riding Hood or other fairy tales. The ending theme song, "Akazukin-chan Goyoujin" (Little Red Riding Hood, Be Careful) by OToGi, makes many references to Little Red Riding Hood and its characters as well.
- In 2013, Geethanjali Kids adapted this story.
- In the Mattel doll franchise and web series, Ever After High, Cerise Hood is the daughter of both Red Riding Hood and the Big Bad Wolf. She shares her father's ears and even has a pet wolf named Carmine. She also has a sister named Ramona Badwolf.
- The character Ruby Rose in the web series RWBY is inspired by Red Riding Hood, as Ruby wears a red hood and fights against werewolves in the series reveal 'Red' Trailer.
- In a 1960 Popeye film called Little Olive Riding Hood, Olive is using a red hood and delivering hamburgers to her sick friend, Wimpy. The Sea Hag wants those hamburgers for herself.
- Grey Wolf and Little Red Riding Hood is a 1990 satirical claymation film produced by Garri Bardin
- The Grimm Variations is a 2024 Netflix anime series, features a retelling of the story. Set in a dystopia where people avoid the real world by entering a virtual reality, the Big Bad Wolf is portrayed as a human serial killer called Grey. Grey kills women to give himself a real-world experience, but then is arranged to meet a woman named Scarlet (Little Red Riding Hood), whom is revealed to also a killer.

== Film ==
- In the early 1960s, María Garcia starred as Little Red Riding Hood in a trilogy of Mexican films by director Roberto Rodriguez, which were then re-dubbed in English and released in the United States courtesy of K. Gordon Murray: the so-called "King of the Kiddie Matinee". These films were: La Caperucita roja (Little Red Riding Hood, 1960), Caperucita y sus tres amigos (Little Red Riding Hood and Her Friends/Little Red Riding Hood and Her Three Friends , 1961) and Caperucita y Pulgarcito contra los monstruos (Little Red Riding Hood and the Monsters, 1962). The latter of these films also starred Cesáreo Quezadas, who reprised his recurring role of Pulgarcito (Tom Thumb).
- Liza Minnelli starred in the television film The Dangerous Christmas of Red Riding Hood (1965), with Cyril Ritchard as the Wolf and Vic Damone as the huntsman. The soundtrack was released the same year. This revisionist fairy tale is told from the Wolf's point of view.
- The Soviet film studio Belarusfilm (1977) made the film Pro Krasnuyu Shapochku (About Red Hat (Russian: Про Красную Шапочку) (in Russian).
- Artist Red Grooms made a 16-minute farcical film version in 1978 starring his daughter Saskia. In 2014 it was combined with a 1984 immersive sculptural work, The Alley, into an exhibition titled Beware a Wolf in the Alley.
- Filmmaker Neil Jordan's horror/fantasy film The Company of Wolves (1984), based on the eponymous short story by Angela Carter, told an interweaving series of folkloric tales loosely based on Red Riding Hood that fully exploited its subtexts of lycanthropy, violence and sexual awakening.
- In the Japanese live-action film The Red Spectacles (1987; aka Akai Megane), the featured "young lady" (as mentioned in the French and German versions of the tale), an allegory for Fate, is dressed like Little Red Riding Hood. An anime version of this character appeared later in the film's sequel, Jin-Roh.
- Red Riding Hood (1987), starring Isabella Rossellini and Craig T. Nelson, is an American/Israeli musical film directed by Adam Brooks.
- Bye bye chaperon rouge (1990), a Canadian/Hungarian production directed by Márta Mészáros.
- CBC's television film adaptation, The Trial of Red Riding Hood (1992), starring figure skater Elizabeth Manley, premiered on the Disney Channel in 1994.
- Freeway (1996), starring Kiefer Sutherland and Reese Witherspoon, adapts the story into a modern setting in which the major characters become a psychotic but charming serial killer (named Bob Wolverton) and a sexually abused teenage girl.
- Christina Ricci starred in Little Red Riding Hood (1997), a short film based on the subject matter.
- The Belgian short film Black XXX-Mas (1999) translates the story to a nightmarish, futuristic urban setting. "The Forest" is the nickname for the junglelike city, and "Wolfy" is a crooked police officer who hounds this film's Little Red.
- The Kenneth Liu short film Falsehood (2001) refigures the Little Red Riding Hood story as a legal drama, with the Big Bad Wolf on trial and Little Bo Peep as his attorney. Scenes between Peep and the Wolf pay homage to the Clarice Starling/Hannibal Lecter scenes in The Silence of the Lambs (1991).
- The horror film Red Riding Hood (2003), directed by Giacomo Cimini, was a darker take on the classic story.
- Singaporean cult director Tzang Merwyn Tong directed the 45-minute short film A Wicked Tale (2005).
- The film Hard Candy (2005), in which a young girl ensnares and tortures a suspected paedophile, was not originally intended to be a Red Riding Hood homage; however, the film's star, Elliot Page, incidentally chose a red hoodie to wear in the final scenes, giving them an unintended metaphoric subtext that was later exploited in advertising for the film.
- Hoodwinked is a 2006 animated movie directed by Cory Edwards and stars Anne Hathaway, Glenn Close, Jim Belushi and Patrick Warburton.
- Red Riding Hood (2006) is a musical film adaptation directed by Randal Kleiser and test-released in late 2004. The experimental virtual reality features were then enhanced for over an additional year. The film stars Morgan Thompson as "Red"; also among the actors are Henry Cavill, Ashley Rose Orr, Andrea Bowen, and music opera entertainers well known on Broadway: Lainie Kazan, Debi Mazar, and Joey Fatone.
- The short film Big Bad Wolves (2006) by Rajneel Singh takes a black-comedy-meets-fantasy approach by having the story told from the point of view of Tarantino-style gangsters who try to convince each other that it is actually a fable about female sexuality. This version features a more classic, fairy tale approach to the narrative and visuals, but also utilizes a werewolf as a literal sexual predator.
- The horror anthology film Trick 'r Treat (2007) contains one story thread inspired by the tale. A girl, played by Anna Paquin, dresses up as Little Red Riding Hood for a Halloween party, but is waylaid by a serial killer in the woods. However, the story twists when she reveals herself to be a werewolf seeking her "first time".
- The 2007 family film Enchanted depicts Red Riding Hood as the villainess of the story who 'tells it a little bit differently' when relating the events of the fairy tale. Princess Giselle claims that her chipmunk sidekick stopped Red from hacking the innocent wolf to death with an axe.
- The slasher film Red Riding Hood – The Blood of Red Riding Hood is based on the story.
- The Syfy film Red: Werewolf Hunter (2010) starring Felicia Day, is a modern, action-film take on the story.
- The film Red Riding Hood (2011), starring Amanda Seyfried, is a period romance/horror film based on the fairy tale.
- The Dutch short film Rood (2013; Red) tells the story of what would have happened if Little Red Riding Hood grew up after the events in the original fairy tale.
- The film Red (2014), starring Jodelle Ferland and Claudia Christian, is a modern adaptation and a low-budget psychological thriller shot in San Francisco.
- The short film Slut (2014), directed by Chloe Okuno, tells the story of a naive young girl who becomes the target of a murderous sociopath when she attempts to reinvent herself to impress the boys in her small Texas town.
- The film Avengers Grimm (2015) sees Red accompanying the princesses Snow White, Sleeping Beauty, Cinderella and Rapunzel into the modern world while the princesses try to stop the escaped Rumpelstiltskin, although Red's only focus is the death of Rumplestiltskin's ally, the Wolf- depicted as a well-built human- to the point that she is considered a danger by the princesses' leader Snow White.

== Television ==
- In 1974, The Carol Burnett Show featured a retelling of La Caperucita Roja, the Mexican version of Little Red Riding Hood, with Carol Burnett as La Caperucita Roja (Little Red Riding Hood), Carl Reiner as El Toro the Bull (instead of a wolf) and Harvey Korman as the Grandmother.
- Probably the most famous use of Little Red Riding Hood in television advertising is the Chanel No. 5 commercial directed by Luc Besson with music by Danny Elfman and starring Estella Warren. In this advertisement, Warren plays a modern-day Red Riding Hood getting ready to enjoy the Paris nightlife, much to the lamentation of her household wolf. The commercial can be viewed here.
- Faerie Tale Theatre adapted Little Red Riding Hood in a season 2 episode, starring Mary Steenburgen as the title character.
- In the season 5 episode of Charmed entitled "Happily Ever After", Piper Halliwell is transformed into Little Red Riding Hood by an evil queen who recently escaped from her magic mirror prison. Her deceased grandmother becomes corporeal again, but is swallowed whole by a wolf sent by the queen. The wolf now in the form of the grandmother then swallows Piper whole to fulfill the queen's plan, but Piper uses her power and blows the wolf up from the inside, freeing herself and her grandmother. Piper then enters the queen's realm through a fairy tales book and destroys the queen.
- In the 2011 ABC TV series Once Upon a Time, a different take on the tale was told during the episode "Red-Handed". The village they lived in was plagued by deadly werewolf attacks and several hunters have been plotting to kill the beast. Red initially assumes that the beast was her boyfriend Peter so she decides to tie him around a tree to help control him. Her plan eventually backfires when the beast was later revealed to be herself. Granny then reveals that it all started when she was bit by her late husband, thus their children and grandchildren metamorphosed into werewolves as well. She eventually lost the ability to metamorphose at a later age but still has the scent. She had asked a wizard to make a red cloak for Red to wear to control it. In Storybrooke, Granny becomes the owner of the town's inn while her granddaughter, now named Ruby, is an unruly young woman who wants to leave town, but stays to care for her and help out with the family business. Red Riding Hood is played by Meghan Ory.
- On the television show Grimm, the tale is re-imagined in the pilot. In it, a lycanthropic creature kidnaps young girls who wear red hoodies/jackets. He lures them by leaving a small figurine. The main character must find him after a little girl is reported missing on her way to her grandfather's house.
- Though not explicitly an adaptation, in an episode of Kamen Rider Ghost entitled "Real Worth! The Power of Fun!", Takeru Tenkuji transforms into Kamen Rider Ghost Mugen Damashii in the Dream World, while dressed as Little Red Riding Hood.
- In the 2014 TV series The Librarians, during an episode entitled "And the Fables of Doom", fairy tales come to life in a small town. One of the fairy tales referenced is Little Red Riding Hood.

== Literature ==
=== Comics ===
Little Red Riding Hood in one of a number of comic book adaptations. Art by Al Rio, published by Zenescope.

- In the Tales of Asgard section of Marvel Comics' series Journey into Mystery No. 114 (1965 March), a story which at the end claims to be the basis of Little Red Riding Hood appears. The goddess Iduna walks through the forests of Asgard carrying a bundle of golden apples. These "Golden Apples of Immortality" are for All-Father Odin, and Iduna brings them to him every year. Along her journey she meets Haakun the Hunter. Haakun greets her warmly and tells her to go in peace. As Iðunn continues further down the path, wearing her crimson cloak and hood, Fenris the Wolf-God sees her and transforms himself. Iduna next comes upon "a frail stranger". The stranger offers Iduna protection along her journey, but she declines the offer. The stranger takes a strong interest in Iduna's basket and begins asking her questions. She quickly grows suspicious, saying his hands seem so grasping -so brutal, and he has an odd voice, like the guttural snarl of a wild beast. She finds his manner sinister-frightening, and says his eyes burn with hatred-with pure savagery. She then discovers that the stranger is actually Fenris the Wolf-God in disguise. Fenris shapeshifts into his true form and attacks her. Haakun the Hunter arrives and drives Fenris away with his enchanted battle ax, causing the Wolf to shrink in an attempt to escape. The ax pursues Fenris and finally strikes him, spiriting him off to the shadowy land of Varinheim.
- Neil Gaiman worked a darker, more erotic, pre-Perrault version of the Red Riding Hood tale in The Doll's House arc of The Sandman comics (1995). In this version, the wolf kills the old lady, tricks the girl into eating her grandmother's meat and drinking her blood, orders the girl to undress and lie in bed with him, and finally devours her. According to Gaiman, his portrayal of the tale was based on the one reported in Robert Darnton's book The Great Cat Massacre: And Other Episodes in French Cultural History.
- Both the Big Bad Wolf and Little Red Riding Hood are characters in the Fables comic book universe (2002–2015). The Big Bad Wolf has taken on a human form and becomes known as Bigby Wolf. He is the sheriff of Fabletown when the series begins. The figure of Red Riding Hood ("Ride") appears three times. The first two instances are actually spies working for the Fables' enemy The Adversary, magically disguising themselves as Little Red Riding Hood (the second of which is actually the witch Baba Yaga). The third Red Riding Hood seems to be the genuine article.
- In Kaori Yuki's manga Ludwig Kakumei (2004–2007), Red Riding Hood is an infamous assassin whose first victims are her parents, after she is tricked by the Prince.
- The character "Red", in the webcomic No Rest for the Wicked (2003–present), lives alone in the woods and always carries an axe with her. After being attacked by a wolf (which she has presumably killed and eaten), she has systematically killed many other wolves in the forest.
- Benkyo Tamaoki created a twisted and dark version of Red Riding Hood in the manga Tokyo Red Hood (2003–2004). It is about a demonic girl dressed as Red Riding Hood who wanted to be devoured by a creature only known as Mr. Wolf.
- An adaptation of Little Red Riding Hood in Zenescope's Grimm Fairy Tales comic series depicts Red Riding Hood as a teenage girl nicknamed Red who is going off to bring food to her sick grandmother, who lives deep in the woods. Red gets attacked by a werewolf that kills her grandmother and attacks Red. Red is saved by the woodsman, named Samson, and the werewolf turns out be a former lover. This story was a teenager's dream sequence after she gets into a fight with her boyfriend, who wanted to have sex with her.
- The manga One Piece references Red Riding Hood in chapter 413: "The Hunter". One of the protagonists, Sogeking, wears a red cloak and is almost killed by a "wolfman", Jyabura. He is saved by Sanji, "the hunter". Later on, Jyabura, attempting to bluff his way out of a fight, depicts Nico Robin (in a red hood) as his sister.
- Streetfables published a modern, urban adaptation of Little Red Riding Hood called Red.
- Issue No. 1 of the Marvel Comics series Spider-Man Fairy Tales (2007) is an adaptation of Little Red Riding Hood, with Mary Jane Watson as the protagonist.
- In Shaun Healey's webcomic EverAfter, Little Red Riding Hood is depicted as having gone insane inside the Big Bad Wolf's belly, and emerged a violent sociopath who chopped up the woodsman with his own saw, and needed to be placed in the EverAfter Maximum Security Asylum, along with other twisted fairy tale characters ranging from Tom Thumb to Goldilocks, Hansel and Gretel, Miss Muffet, etc., all under the care of President Humpty Dumpty and Dr. Crooked (from a nursery rhyme).
- Serena Valentino and Foo Swee Chin wrote and illustrated an adaptation of Red Riding Hood in Nightmares & Fairy Tales No. 8, wherein Red is known as Luna. This comic version focuses on Luna's struggle to cope with her fellow villagers' intense disdain for wolves. When a supposedly "dead" wolf kills her father, Luna sympathizes with the animal more than her parent, causing her mother to throw her out of the house in a fit of rage. Luna befriends a kind young man on the way to her grandmother's house and eventually discovers that her grandmother is a werewolf. When Luna's mother arrives and kills Luna's werewolf-grandmother, Luna begins to shapeshift into a white wolf but is spared a gruesome death when her friend, in werewolf-form, rescues her.

=== Collections ===
Many of the short stories and poems (as well as many older texts) are collected in The Trials and Tribulations of Little Red Riding Hood by Jack Zipes.

=== Novels ===
- Wolf by Gillian Cross (1990), winner of the 1991 Carnegie Medal. This is a very loose adaptation of the tale set in the modern day.
- Caperucita en Manhattan by Carmen Martín Gaite (1990).
- Witches Abroad by Terry Pratchett (1991) parodies a number of fairy tales, including Little Red Riding Hood. In this version Granny Weatherwax and Nanny Ogg stop the wolf before it has a chance to eat the grandmother (much to its own relief, as it's acting against its will). Nanny Ogg remembers hearing about the same thing happening a couple of villages away, when she was a girl. She also refers obliquely to an incident when she visited her grandmother in a red hood, involving "Sumpkins the lodger".
- Little Red Riding Hood in the Red Light District by Manlio Argueta (1998).
- Darkest Desire: The Wolf's Own Tale by Anthony Schmitz (1998).
- Low Red Moon by Caitlín R. Kiernan (2003).
- Little Red Riding Wolf (Seriously Silly Stories) (2004), a children's novel by Laurence Anholt and Arthur Robins, in which the roles of the main characters are reversed, so that the 'Big Bad Girl' terrorises the innocent hero, Little Red Riding Wolf, before meeting her come-uppance from the terrifying Old Granny Wolf.
- The Book of Lost Things by John Connolly (2006).
- The Sisters Grimm series, in which Red Riding Hood is said to have gone insane after her encounter with the wolf.
- Red Rider's Hood (2006) by Neal Shusterman.
- Sisters Red (2010) by Jackson Pearce.
- Red Hood's Revenge (2010) by Jim C. Hines The third book in Hines' Princess series- starring Danielle Whiteshore (Cinderella), Talia Malak-el-Dahshat (Sleeping Beauty), and Snow White as a trio of 'secret agents' for Danielle's mother-in-law-, Roudette has become an assassin known as the Lady of the Red Hood, after her family were killed by the Wild Hunt, a group of monstrous spirits who kill anyone in their path; the wolf in her story was actually her grandmother wearing an enchanted wolf-skin when she was killed by the Hunt for her long vendetta against them. After her grandmother's death, Roudette took the skin and combined it with her pre-existing red cloak; initially enchanted to block magic, Roudette had the runes changed so that they deflect fairy magic, the combination of the two cloaks making Roudette immune to magic cast on her directly and able to transform into a wolf. She is killed at the conclusion of the novel after defeating the Wild Hunt, with her cloak being subsequently claimed by her former rival Talia (aka Sleeping Beauty).
- Dust City (2010) by Robert Paul Weston. Deals more with the wolf.
- Glasgow Fairytale (2010) by Alastair D McIver is based on intertwined versions of traditional fairy tales set in and around modern-day Glasgow, including the story of Wee Red Hoodie and the Big Bad Wolf.
- Red Riding Hood (2011) by Sarah Blakley-Cartwright.
- The Red Hood, Black Hood Trilogy (2012) by Kenneth W. Hether, a previously published serial novel that retold the events of Little Red Riding Hood in a futuristic urban setting. As of December 2017 the original serial consisting of three novellas has been the only completed collection in a planned hexology announced on the author's Facebook upon publishing the first trilogy. The series has since been cancelled in an open letter to fans promising that one day the stories would return as a "retooled and, frankly more robust" version of itself.
- Scarlet (2013) by Marissa Meyer. The second book in The Lunar Chronicles, a series of interconnected fairy-tale retellings in a gritty futuristic setting.
- Red Riding Hood (2019) Lost Story by Beatrix Potter and illustrated by Helen Oxenbury adapted from the French of Charles Perrault.

=== Picture books ===
- The Tale of Jemima Puddle-Duck (1908) by Beatrix Potter was heavily based upon Red Riding Hood.
- Chapeuzinho Amarelo by Chico Buarque (1970).
- Flossie & the Fox by Patricia McKissack.
- Lon Po Po: A Red-Riding Hood Story from China by Ed Young (1990).
- Kawoni's Journey Across the Mountain: A Cherokee Little Red Riding Hood by Cordellya Smith (2014).
- Petite Rouge: A Cajun Red Riding Hood by Jim Harris (illustrator) Mike Artell (2001).
- Beware of the Storybook Wolves by Lauren Child.
- The Girl in Red (2012), a modern reimagining of the fairy tale, which is written by Aaron Frisch and illustrated by Roberto Innocenti.
- Little Red Overalls (2013) by Aaron Burakoff

=== Poetry ===
- "How Little Red Riding Hood Came to be Eaten" by Guy Wetmore Carryl in Grimm Tales Made Gay (1902).
- "Little Red Riding Hood" by Olga Broumas, published in Beginning With O (1977).
- "Little Red Riding Hood and the Wolf" by Roald Dahl, published in Revolting Rhymes (1983) – features a comical and violent twist in which Red turns the wolf into a wolf-skin coat.
- "The Waiting Wolf" by Gwen Strauss, published in Trail of Stones (1990).
- "On a Nineteenth Century Color Lithograph of Red Riding Hood by the Artist J.H." by Alice Wirth Gray, published in What the Poor Eat (1993).
- "Journeybread Recipe" by Lawrence Schimel, published in Black Thorn, White Rose (1994).
- "Silver and Gold" by Ellen Steiber, published in The Armless Maiden (1996).
- "Little Red Cap" by Carol Ann Duffy, published in The World's Wife (1999).
- "Grandmother" by Lawrence Syndal, published in Conjunctions #31 (1999).
- "Red Riding Hood's Dilemma" by Órfhlaith Foyle, published in Red Riding Hood's Dilemma (2009).

=== Short stories ===
- In 1940, Howard L. Chace, a professor of French, wrote Ladle rat rotten hut, where the story is told using incorrect homonyms of the correct English words.
- "The Company of Wolves" by Angela Carter, published in The Bloody Chamber (1979). This famous and influential version was the basis for the Neil Jordan film (below).
- "Wolfland" by Tanith Lee, published in Red as Blood (1983).
- "I Shall Do Thee Mischief in the Woods" by Kathe Koja, published in Snow White, Blood Red (1993).
- "Little Red" by Wendy Wheeler, published in Snow White, Blood Red (1993).
- The Apprentice" by Miriam Grace Monfredo, published in Ellery Queen's Mystery Magazine (November 1993).
- "Little Red Riding Hood" published in James Finn Garner's Politically Correct Bedtime Stories (1994) satirises politically correct speech, focusing on such things as womyn's rights. See also Politically Correct Red Riding Hood, which features a very different outcome.
- "The Good Mother" by Priscilla Galloway, published in Truly Grim Tales (1995).
- "Riding the Red" by Nalo Hopkinson, published in Black Swan, White Raven (1997).
- "Wolf" by Francesca Lia Block, published in The Rose and the Beast, turns the wolf into a lecherous stepfather who is sexually abusing his stepdaughter (2000).
- "The Road of Pins" by Caitlín R. Kiernan, first published in Dark Terrors 6 (2002), reprinted in To Charles Fort, With Love (2005).
- "Little Red and the Big Bad" by Will Shetterly, published in Swan Sister (2003).
- James Thurber's short story "The Little Girl and the Wolf" features the heroine turning the tables on the Wolf by taking an automatic pistol out of her basket and shooting him. The moral says it all: "It is not so easy to fool little girls nowadays as it used to be."

== Music and music videos ==
- "Little Red Riding Hood" is a name of one étude from a series of studies "Étude-Tableau" by Sergej Rachmaninov.
- The song "How Could Red Riding Hood (Have Been So Very Good)?," written by A.P. Randolph in 1925 and published in 1926 (see 1966 hit song "Lil' Red Riding Hood").
- The music video for the VAST (Visual Audio Sensory Theater) song "Pretty when you Cry" is heavily inspired by Little Red Riding Hood. It focuses heavily on the sexual undertones of the story and psychology of sexual predation.
- The last four tracks of Japanese black metal band Kadenzza's 2005 album The Second Renaissance follow the plot of Little Red Riding Hood.
- Bowling For Soup recorded a cover version of Sam the Sham & the Pharaohs' "Lil' Red Riding Hood" for the soundtrack to the werewolf film Cursed. This song is included in their 2005 compilation album Bowling for Soup Goes to the Movies.
- The Blessed Virgin Larry released a remake and music video of Lil' Red Riding Hood on their 2005 CD "The United Police States Of America"
- Evanescence's music video for the song "Call Me When You're Sober" is heavily inspired by Little Red Riding Hood.
- Nerdcore rapper MC Frontalot retells the Little Red Riding Hood story in his song "Start Over".
- Children Of Bodom's album Hate Crew Deathroll contains a song named "Lil' Bloodred Ridin' Hood".
- The music video for "Ordinary Day" by Dolores O'Riordan features a young girl in a red hood running through a wooded area.
- The lyrics of "Hungry Like the Wolf" by Duran Duran were inspired by Little Red Riding Hood.
- The songs 'Wolf' and 'Paint Hell Red' by Angelspit are both inspired by Little Red Riding Hood, particularly the sexual undertones.
- An adaptation of Little Red Riding Hood was used in the music video for the Mika song "Lollipop", in which the main character, instead of being Little Red Riding Hood, is called the Lollipop Girl, does not have a red hood and is, at the end the music video, eaten up by the wolf.
- Belgian dance act Lasgo released a music video for their song All Night Long in which singer Evi Goffin plays Little Red Riding Hood.
- The Wolf by Fever Ray is based on the Little Red Riding Hood story and is featured in Red Riding Hood.
- The video clip for Lickanthrope (2013) by Moonspell is a free adaptation of the "Little Red Riding Hood" theme including references to horror films and to movies such as Kill Bill and From Dusk till Dawn. In the video, Little Red Riding Hood is actually a Japanese female sword fighter confronting a werewolf in a "freak tavern" similar to the one found in From Dusk till Dawn.
- The song "Little Red" by singer-songwriter Kate Nash from the 2005 album Made of Bricks uses imagery from the story (the girl's name; description of a fairy tale community).
- The song "Through Wolf's Eyes" by a power metal/folk metal band Elvenking on their album "Era" retells the story of Little Red Riding Hood through the view of the Wolf, though in the song the Wolf desires love instead of outright eating Little Red.

== Musicals and operas ==
- The comic opera Le petit chaperon de rouge by François-Adrien Boieldieu was first performed at the Salle Feydeau (Opéra-Comique) on 30 June 1818.
- The musical Little Red Riding Hood by playwright George T. Richardson was based on British pantomime productions of the fairy tale and starred actress Ethel Jackson as the title character. It premiered at the Boston Museum on Christmas Eve 1899, and then transferred to Broadway's Casino Theatre where it opened on January 8, 1900.
- Stephen Sondheim and James Lapine's musical Into the Woods plays with the typical devices of a number of different fairy tales, including Little Red Riding Hood.
- An operatic version was composed for the children's theater of Natalia Sats by Mikhail Rauchwerger.
- The tale seems to hold a particular attraction for Greek composers; opera versions of it have been produced by George Kouroupos (1988), Kharálampos Goyós (1998), and Georges Aperghis (2001).
- A new stage musical adaptation Red Riding Hood by London-based writing team Jake Brunger and Pippa Cleary opened at the Singapore Repertory Theatre in November 2013, where it ran for 6 weeks.

== Toys ==
- The Lego Minifigure, "Grandma Visitor", is based on Little Red Riding Hood.
- Todd McFarlane's "Twisted Fairy Tales" action figure line includes a more voluptuous Red Riding Hood holding a dead wolf with its entrails and Grandma dripping out of its stomach. A similar but less gory figure is part of the "Scary Tales" line of figures (not by McFarlane).

== Video games ==
- An unlicensed game called Little Red Hood was produced for the Nintendo Entertainment System.
- Final Fantasy Fables: Chocobo Tales (2006) includes a pair of storybooks entitled "Mini Red Riding Hood", which uses the popular story as its basis, but instead of being threatened by a wolf, Red has to contend with the lightning spirit Ramuh on her way to her grandmother's house.
- World of Warcraft: The Burning Crusade (2007) features The Big Bad Wolf as one of the random encounters in the Karazhan opera event. The Wolf transforms a random player into Red Riding Hood and chases her around the room.
- Little Red Riding Hood is the title of the second episode of the episodic game series American McGee's Grimm (2008) which features a dwarf ("Grimm") bent on returning fairy tales to their supposedly much darker origins. American McGee also returned to the theme of Red Riding Hood with his 2010 interactive story for the iPad, Akaneiro: A Red Riding Hood Story.
- Little Red Riding Hood's Zombie BBQ (2008) was released for the Nintendo DS. It was developed by EnjoyUp and published by Destineer (known for other DS games such as Fullmetal Alchemist: Dual Sympathy (2005) and Candy Factory (2008)) and got a successful review score of 8.6 at IGN.
- The French publisher Anuman Interactive launched an edutainment software based on Perrault's tale, Little Red Riding Hood, on PC.
- Former Capcom designer Akira "Akiman" Yasuda created a character entitled B.B. Hood (an acronym for "Baby Bonnie Hood", Japanese name "Bulleta"), who is inspired by the protagonist in the Little Red Riding Hood fables. "Hood" as-it-were is something of a loose interpretation of the character; in that her persona is far more eccentric, volatile, and outlandish than what is typically depicted in the classic tale. This particular character has been seen in subsequent Capcom video game releases including: the Darkstalkers video game series (in which she first appeared), and the second installment of the video game series Marvel vs. Capcom.
- The Path (2009), an art game by Belgian developer Tale of Tales, is primarily inspired by various older versions of the Red Riding Hood tale.
- Overlord: Dark Legend (2009) was released for the Wii and features a mysterious young girl named Li'l Red who asks the Overlord to escort her through the Withering Woods to her grandmother's house near the beginning of the game. However, once they reach her grandmother's house it is revealed that she is actually a "Wolf Queen" in disguise, essentially taking the place of both Little Red Riding Hood and the Big Bad Wolf.
- The MMORPG Adventure Quest Worlds (2008) has a brunette variation of Red Riding Hood, called Red Hunting Hood. Here she is a skilled huntress who wants the players' help to hunt down several monsters.
- Fairytale Fights (2009) has Lil' Red as a playable character.
- In the point-and-click game Dark Parables: The Red Riding Hood Sisters (2012), the player controls the young girl and investigates the appearance of the Wolf Queen. Centuries ago, the first Red Riding Hood Isabella was saved from the wolf by the huntsman. He adopted the orphaned girl and taught her how to fight. After he was killed in a wolf attack Isabella established the "Order of Red Riding Hood Sisters" in the Vosges Mountains, Eastern France.
- The Dark Side of Red Riding Hood (2013), an RPG Maker horror game made by the developer team Charon. Little Red Riding Hood is sent at her mother's request to visit her ailing grandmother, with multiple endings depending on your choices.
- The Wolf Among Us (2013–2014), a video game adaptation of the comic Fables where the player controls the Big Bad Wolf, Bigby Wolf. The character Red is only mentioned briefly, mentioning that she didn't survive after the fables escaped their homelands. Later, the Fables series was amended by a comic book adaptation of the game.
- Woolfe: The Red Hood Diaries (2015) is a side-scrolling platform hack and slash video game developed and published by Belgian independent development studio GriN Gamestudio.
- The main character of the RPG Black Souls series, Red Hood, is based on the fairy tale character of the same name.

== Visual art ==
- For the Grimm's Fairy Tales' 200th anniversary, Google featured the Little Red Riding Hood Story as the Google Doodle.
- Postage stamps were issued in Germany, in 1960, and Switzerland, in 1985, depicting the tale of Little Red Riding Hood.

== See also ==
- Category:Works based on Little Red Riding Hood
