= Kurt Hessenberg =

German composer and professor

Kurt Hessenberg (17 August 1908 – 17 June 1994) was a German composer and professor at the Hochschule für Musik und Darstellende Kunst in Frankfurt.

== Life ==
Kurt Hessenberg was born on 17 August 1908 in Frankfurt, as the fourth and last child of the lawyer Eduard Hessenberg and his wife Emma, née Kugler. Among his ancestors was Heinrich Hoffmann, whose famous children's book Struwwelpeter Hessenberg was to arrange for children's choir (op. 49) later in his life. From 1927–1931 Hessenberg studied at the Leipzig Conservatory. Among his teachers were Günter Raphael (composition) and Robert Teichmüller (piano). In 1933 Hessenberg became a teacher at the Hoch'sche Konservatorium in Frankfurt am Main, where he himself had taken his earliest music lessons. In 1940 Hessenberg received the "Nationaler Kompositionspreis" (national prize for composition), joined the NSDAP in 1942, and in 1951 he was awarded the Robert-Schumann-Prize of the city of Düsseldorf for his cantata "Vom Wesen und Vergehen" op. 45. Hessenberg was appointed professor of composition at the Hochschule für Musik und Darstellende Kunst in 1953 and taught there until his retirement in 1973. Kurt Hessenberg died in Frankfurt am Main on 17 June 1994.

Hessenberg's work contributed significantly to the repertoire of the Protestant churches in the 20th century. Among his most noted students were Peter Cahn, Margaret Vardell Sandresky, and Hans Zender.
