= Struwwelpeter =

1845 German children's book by Heinrich Hoffmann

Der Struwwelpeter
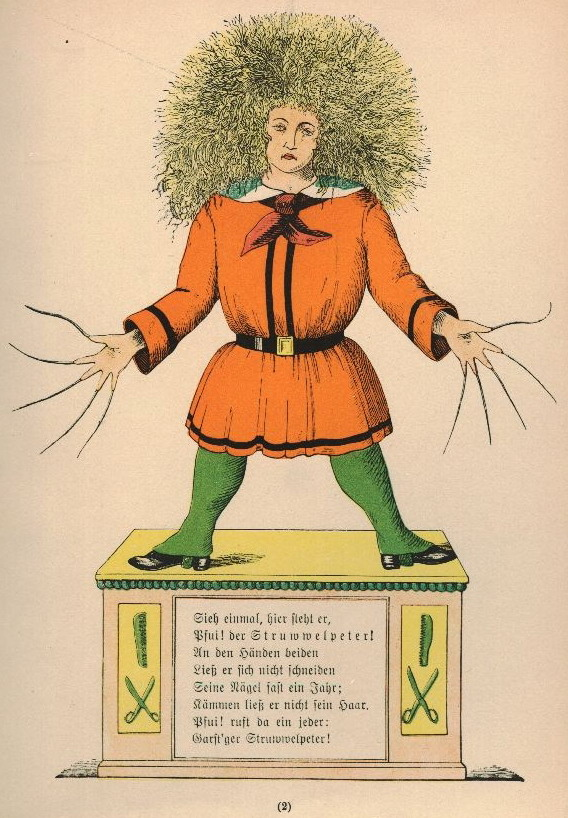
- Struwwelpeter in the edition from 1861
- Author: Heinrich Hoffmann
- Working title: Lustige Geschichten und drollige Bilder mit 15 schön kolorierten Tafeln für Kinder von 3–6 Jahren
- Illustrator: Heinrich Hoffmann
- Language: German
- Subject: Cautionary tale
- Genre: Children's book
- Published: 1845
- Publication date: October 1845
- Publication place: Free City of Frankfurt (Part of German Confederation) (1845) German Empire (1917 Edition)
- Followed by: König Nussknacker und der arme Reinhold

Der Struwwelpeter ('Shock-Headed Peter') is an 1845 German children's book written and illustrated by the German psychiatrist Heinrich Hoffmann. It comprises ten illustrated and rhymed stories, mostly about children. Each cautionary tale has a clear moral lesson that demonstrates the disastrous consequences of misbehavior in an exaggerated way. The title of the first story provides the title of the whole book.

Der Struwwelpeter is one of the earliest books for children that combine visual and verbal narratives in a book format, and is considered a precursor to comic books. Der Struwwelpeter is known for introducing the villainous character of the Tailor (or Scissorman) to Western literature. Some researchers now see the stories in the book as illustrations of modern child mental disorders.

== Background ==
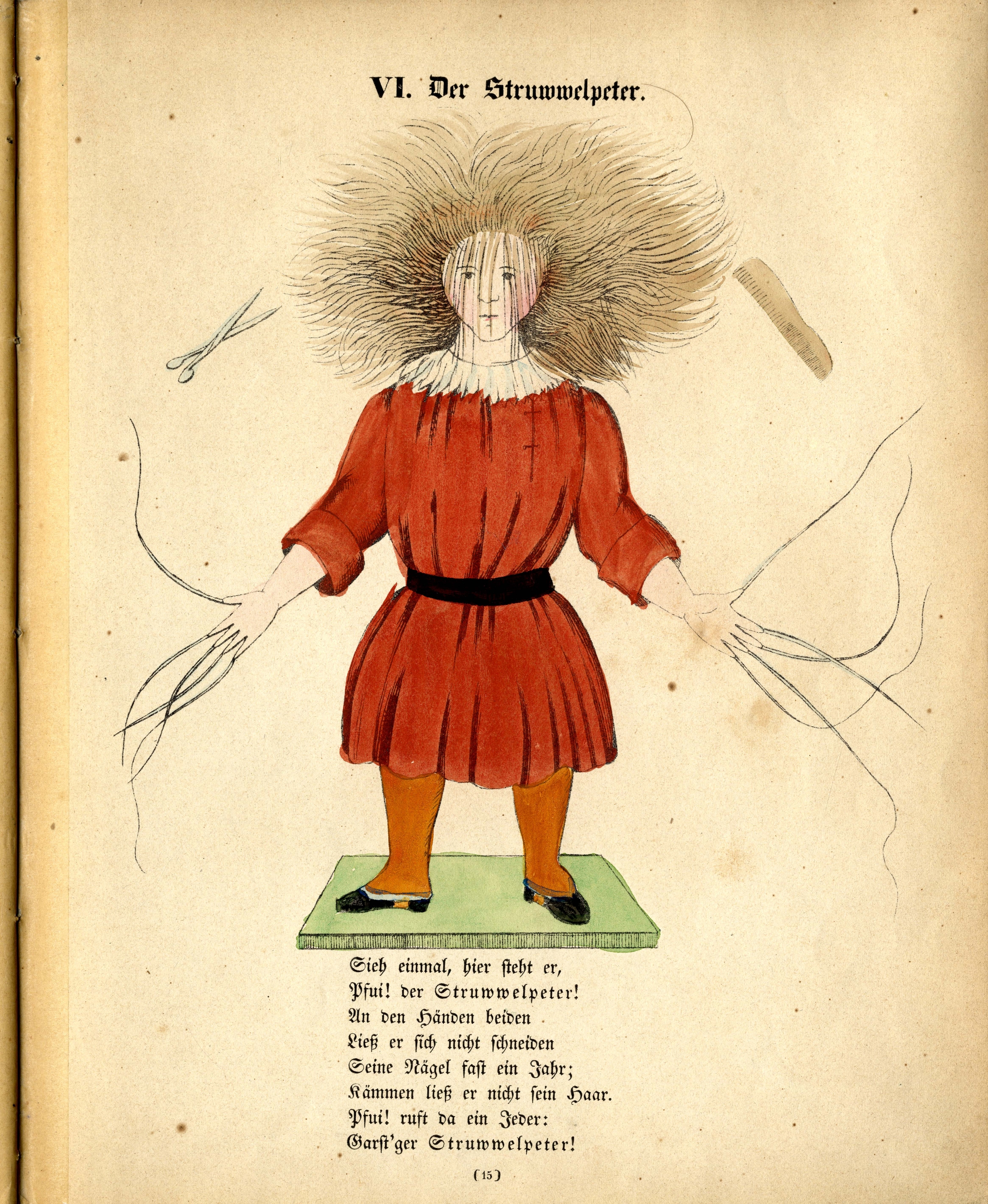
First stanza of The Struwwelpeter in the book (first edition, 1845)

Hoffmann wrote the book that would later be titled Struwwelpeter in reaction to what he perceived as a lack of good books for children. Intending to buy a picture book as a Christmas present for his three-year-old son, Hoffmann instead wrote and illustrated his own book. At the time of producing it, Hoffmann had no intentions of publishing his book.

=== Publications ===
The first appearance of Hoffmann's book outside his immediate family circle was in a meeting organized by Frankfurt literary club Tutti Frutti Society (Gesellschaft der Tutti-Frutti) on 18 January 1845. On the evening of that day, Zacharias Löwenthal, a co-founder of publishing company Literarische Anstalt, bought Hoffmann's book for 80 gulden. Hoffmann later wrote that "[in] that night, at 11 o'clock, I had, almost without knowing what I had done, suddenly become an author of juvenile books."

The book first appeared in the Frankfurt marketplace in October of that year under the title Lustige Geschichten und drollige Bilder mit 15 schön kolorierten Tafeln für Kinder von 3–6 Jahren ("funny stories and droll pictures with 15 beautifully coloured panels for children of 3–6 years"). The first version had its illustrations printed with lithographic plates and colored by hand with stencils, the text was printed using typesetting. On 3 October, the book was advertised in the Börsenblatt for a retail price of 48 kreuzer.

In 1846, three other editions of the book were published. The second edition had 5,000 copies produced, each of which was priced at 57 kreuzer; Hoffmann's royalty was of 6.25 percent per copy. Hoffmann's name was only partially revealed in the second edition, where he used the pseudonym "Hoffmann Kinderslieb". His authorship of the book was, however, fully revealed to the public in an advertisement featured on a Frankfurter Konversationsblatt publication on 11 December 1846. Hoffmann's real name was only fully displayed in the fifth edition, which was published in 1847.

The third edition was the first to be officially titled Struwwelpeter, though the second edition had already been nicknamed as such by some book reviewers.

=== English editions ===
The titles Struwelpeter and Strewelpeter have been used in multiple English editions of Struwwelpeter. The name Slovenly Peter was first found in an 1849 American version of the book.

British twin illustrators Janet and Anne Grahame Johnstone provided new illustrations for an English translation published in 1950.

=== Copyright issues ===
In 1847, Struwwelpeter's publishing house sued a Nuremberg publisher for printing the book on broadsheets.

In 1851, the same organization sued publisher Christian Scholz on grounds that he had plagiarized Struwwelpeter by publishing translations of the book in English, Dutch and Swedish. Scholz lost the case and was sentenced to pay a fine of 1,040 gulden, along with court costs of 127 gulden. He was also ordered to destroy all lithographic plates and unsold books in his inventory. This became one of the first copyright court cases in Germany.

In 1891 Mark Twain wrote his own translation of the book, but because of copyright issues Twain's Slovenly Peter was not published until 1935, 25 years after his death.

== The stories ==
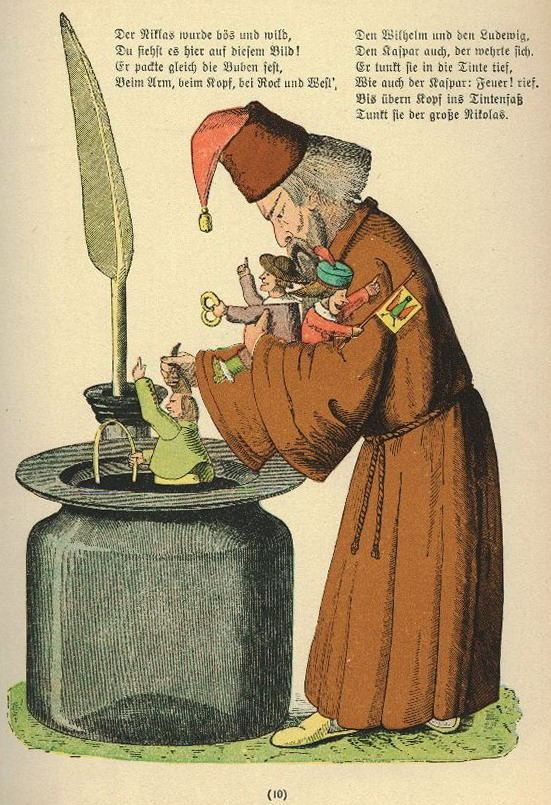
Nikolas, dunking the racist boys in ink. Illustration from a 1917 edition.

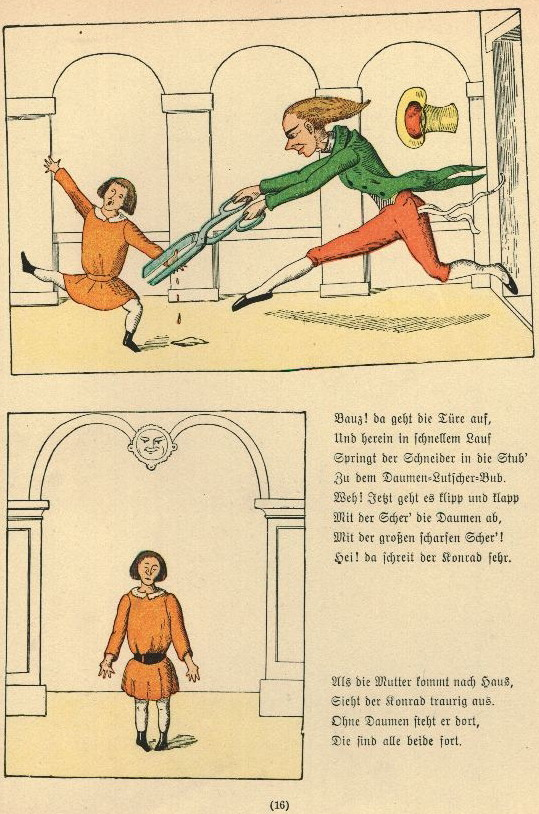
Konrad’s thumbs are amputated by the tailor

1. Struwwelpeter describes a lazy, dirty boy who does not groom himself properly and is consequently unpopular.
2. Die Geschichte vom bösen Friederich ("The Story of Wicked Frederick"): A violent boy terrorizes animals and people. Eventually he is bitten by a dog, who goes on to eat the boy's food while Frederick is bedridden.
3. Die gar traurige Geschichte mit dem Feuerzeug ("The Very Sad Story of the Matches"): A girl ("Pauline" in the original German version) plays with matches, accidentally ignites herself and burns to death. Only her cats mourn her.
4. Die Geschichte von den schwarzen Buben ("The Story of the Inky Boys"): Nikolas (or "Agrippa" in some translations) catches three boys teasing a dark-skinned boy. To teach them a lesson, he dips them in black ink.
5. Die Geschichte von dem wilden Jäger ("The Story of the Wild Huntsman") is the only story not primarily focused on children. In it, a hare steals a hunter's musket and eyeglasses and begins to hunt the hunter. In the ensuing chaos, the hare's child is burned by hot coffee and the hunter jumps into a well.
6. Die Geschichte vom Daumenlutscher ("The Story of the Thumb-Sucker"): A mother warns her son Konrad not to suck his thumbs. However, when she goes out of the house he resumes his thumb-sucking, until a roving tailor appears and cuts off his thumbs with giant scissors.
7. Die Geschichte vom Suppen-Kaspar ("The Story of Kaspar and the Soup") begins as Kaspar (or "Augustus" in some translations), a healthy, strong boy, proclaims that he will no longer eat his soup. Over the next five days, he becomes skinny, wastes away, and dies. The last illustration shown is of his grave, which has a soup tureen atop it.
8. Die Geschichte vom Zappel-Philipp ("The Story of Fidgety Philip"): A boy who won't sit still at dinner accidentally knocks all of the food onto the floor, to his parents' great displeasure.
9. Die Geschichte von Hans Guck-in-die-Luft ("The Story of Johnny Head-in-the-Clouds") concerns a boy who habitually fails to watch where he is walking. One day he walks into a river; he is soon rescued, but his briefcase drifts away.
10. Die Geschichte vom fliegenden Robert ("The Story of Flying Robert"): A boy goes outside during a storm. The wind catches his umbrella and lifts him high into the air, with the boy sailing into the distance.

== Music, film, and stage adaptations ==
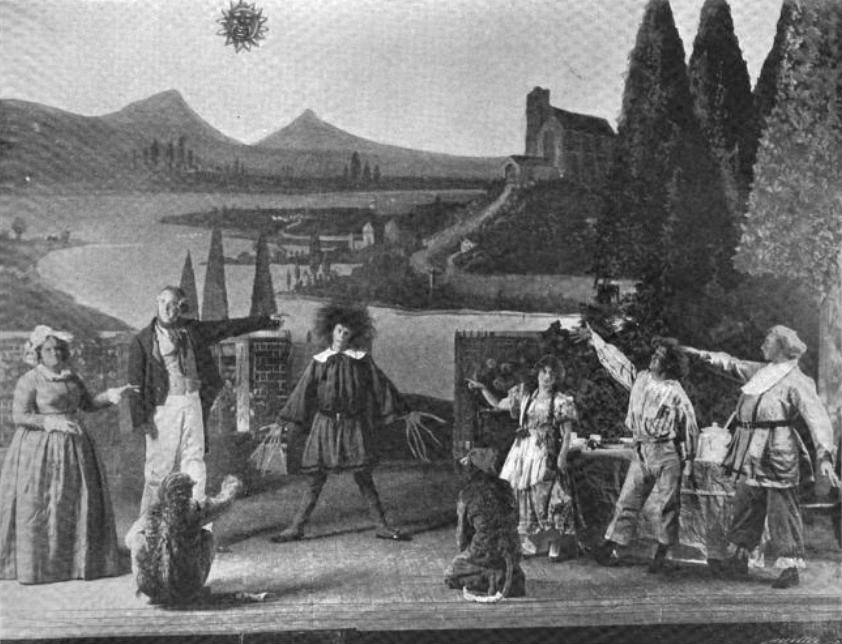
Shock-Headed Peter at the Garrick Theatre

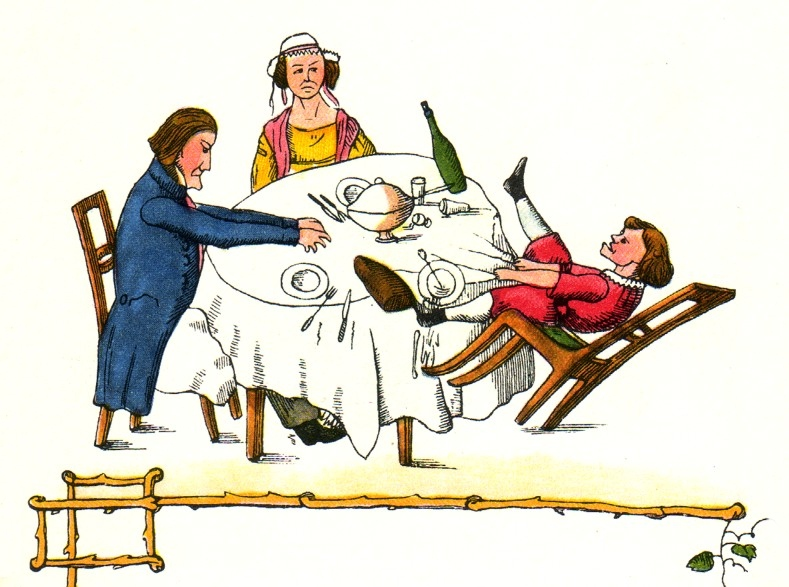
"Die Geschichte vom Zappel-Philipp". Illustration from the 1845 edition.

A British stage production of Shockheaded Peter, by Philip Carr and Nigel Playfair, with music by Walter Rubens, premiered at the Garrick Theatre in London on 26 December 1900, and played 41 performances. The title role was played by George Grossmith Jr., with Kate Bishop as Mamma and Kitty Loftus as Harriet. The piece returned to the Garrick the following year, again playing 41 performances from 14 December, this time with Lawrence Grossmith as Peter, Nina Boucicault as Harriet and 11-year-old Marie Lohr as "Child". In a revival at the Wimbledon Theatre in South London from 26 December 1929 Mamma was played in a limited run of matinees by Louie Pounds, with H. Scott Russell as Papa, Leslie Holland as Augustus and Rex London as Peter.

Geoffrey Shaw's Struwelpeter, produced in 1914, featured the song "Conrad Suck-a-Thumb" by Martin Shaw.

A ballet of Der Struwwelpeter with music composed by Norbert Schultze was produced in Germany before World War II.

A live action film based on the book was released in Germany in 1955. Directed by Fritz Genschow, in this adaptation there is a "happy" ending where the characters' bad deeds are reversed.

Little Suck-a-Thumb (1992) is a psychoanalytical interpretation of the infamous cautionary tale. The short film by writer/director David Kaplan stars Cork Hubbert and Evelyn Solann, with Jim Hilbert as the Great Tall Scissorman.

"The Misadventures of Struwwelpeter" for tenor and piano (also orchestrated for chamber ensemble) was composed by Michael Schelle in 1991. Five of the stories are included in the original version with piano. "Inky Boys" is included only in the chamber version.

Struwwelpeterlieder (1996) is a setting of three of the stories for soprano, viola and piano by American composer Lowell Liebermann.

German composer Kurt Hessenberg (a descendant of Hoffmann) arranged Der Struwwelpeter for children's choir (op. 49) later in his life.

Shockheaded Peter (1998) is a British musical by The Tiger Lillies. that combines elements of pantomime and puppetry with musical versions of the poems with the songs generally following the text. It won a number of British theatre awards in the years following its release.

Composer Kenneth Hesketh's 2000–2001 work, Netsuke (from the Japanese miniature sculptures called netsuke) comprises five short movements inspired variously by Saint-Exupéry's Le Petit Prince, Struwwelpeter, and a poem by Walter de la Mare.

== Comics adaptations ==
German comics artist David Füleki has created a number of manga-style adaptions of Struwwelpeter:

- Struwwelpeter: Die Rückkehr (2009, Tokyopop)
- Struwwelpeter: Das große Buch der Störenfriede (2009, Tokyopop)
- Struwwelpeter in Japan (Free Comic Book Day comic; 2012, Delfinium Prints)

The Scissorman story is adapted into comics form by Sanya Glisic in The Graphic Canon, Volume 2, published in 2012.

== Media influences ==
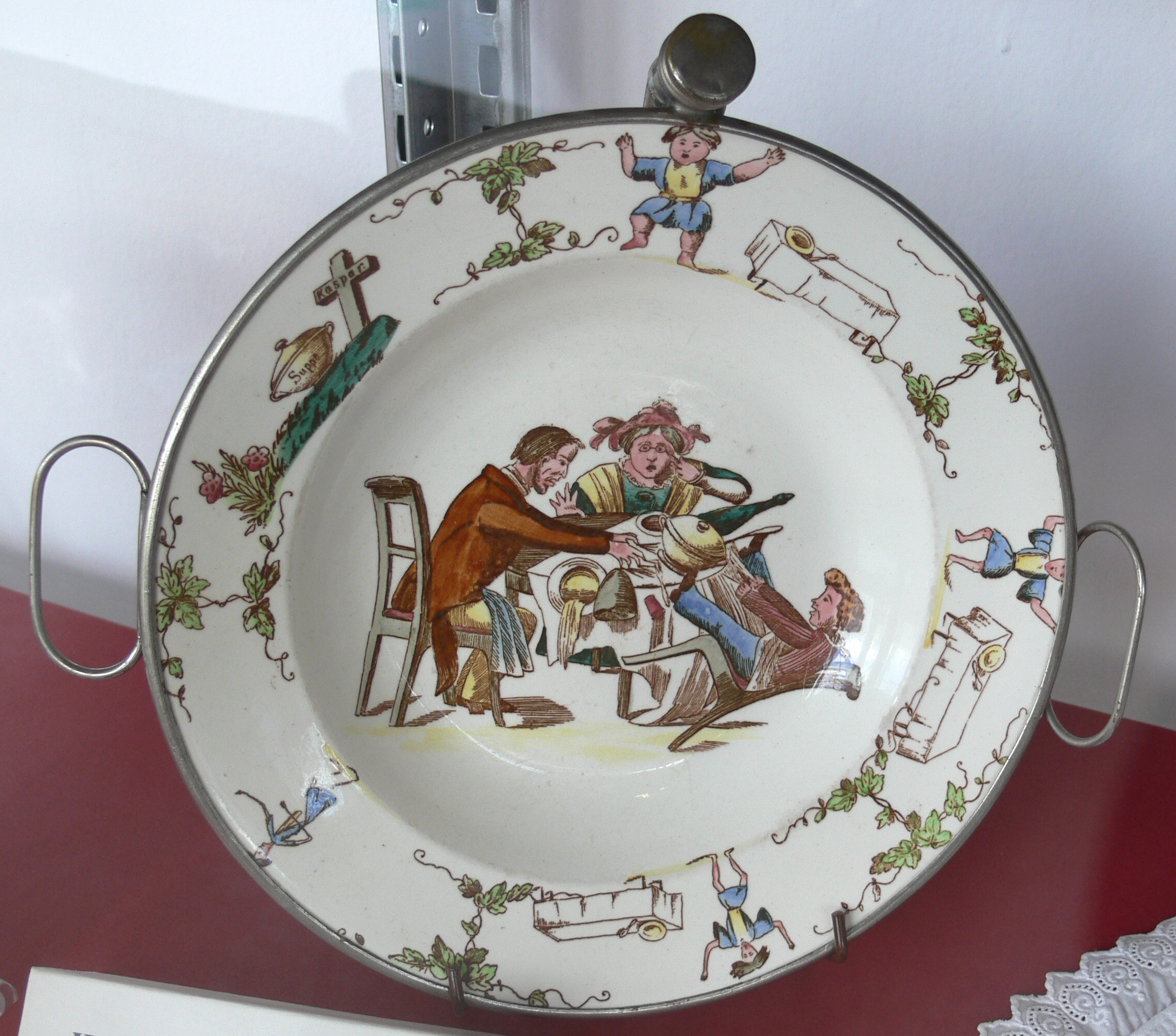
Struwwelpeter soup rim bowl featuring the story of fidgety Phillip and on the edge the story of the Soup-Kaspar

=== Literature ===
English author Edward Harold Begbie's first published book, The Political Struwwelpeter (1898), is of British politics, with the British Lion is as Struwwelpeter, "bedraggled, with long, uncut claws."

W. H. Auden refers to the Scissor-Man in his 1930 poem "The Witnesses" (also known as "The Two"):

And now with sudden swift emergence
Come the women in dark glasses, the humpbacked surgeons
And the Scissor Man.

Adolf Hitler was parodied as a Struwwelpeter caricature in 1941 in a book called Struwwelhitler, published in Britain under the pseudonym Dr. Schrecklichkeit (Dr. Horrors).

The "Story of Soup-Kaspar" is parodied in Astrid Lindgren's Pippi Longstocking (1945), with a tall story about a Chinese boy named Peter who refuses to eat a swallow's nest served to him by his father, and dies of starvation five months later.

English illustrator Charles Folkard's imaginative study "A Nonsense Miscellany," published in 1956 in Roger Lancelyn Green's anthology The Book of Nonsense, by Many Authors, is a seaside scene that incorporated Baron Munchausen, Struwwelpeter, and a variety of characters from the works of Lewis Carroll and Edward Lear.

Jamie Rix said that the book inspired him to create Grizzly Tales for Gruesome Kids when his publisher asked him to write more short stories about rude children. His mother had given him the book as a child and the stories gave him nightmares. Rix wanted to create a similar series of books for his children's generation.

Der Fall Struwwelpeter ("The Struwwelpeter Case"), 1989, by Jörg M. Günther is a satirical treatment in which the various misdeeds in the story - both by the protagonists and their surroundings - are analyzed via the regulations of the German Strafgesetzbuch.

The Jasper Fforde fantasy/mystery novel The Fourth Bear (Hodder & Stoughton, 2006) opens with a police sting operation by the Nursery Crime Division to arrest the Scissorman.

Der schmutzige Peter (Dirty Peter) by Amir Dori is presented as a modern parody and homage to Struwwelpeter. Like Hoffmann's book, it uses rhyming cautionary stories, but its stories are written for adults and use dark satire and gallows humor. The book describes fictional characters suffering absurd consequences because of careless or foolish decisions.

=== Comics ===
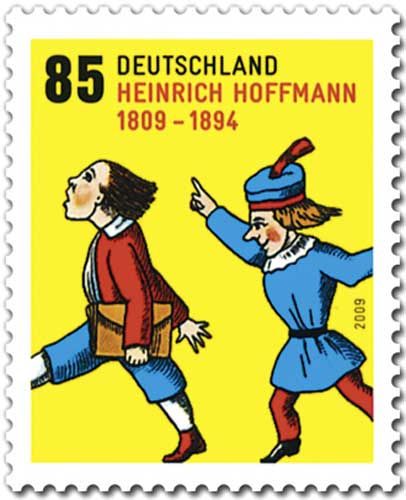
Stamp with two Struwwelpeter characters, Hans Guck-in-die Luft and Ludwig from "Die Geschichte mit den schwarzen Buben", issued on Hoffmann's 200th birthday

German cartoonist F. K. Waechter's Anti-Struwwwelpeter (1970) is a parody of Der Struwwelpeter.

Comic book writer Grant Morrison references "Die Geschichte vom Daumenlutscher" in the first story arc of their Doom Patrol run with the recurring line, "The door flew open, in he ran / The great, long, red-legged scissorman." Doom Patrol member Dorothy Spinner, who has the ability to bring imaginary beings to life, considers among her imaginary friends the characters Flying Robert (a ghost baby balloon thing) and The Inky Boys.

The 2000 AD strip London Falling (June–July 2006), by Simon Spurrier and Lee Garbett, explores bogeymen from English folklore and mythology wreaking havoc in a modern-day setting. Two of the characters, Peter Struwwel and The Tailor, are taken from Der Struwwelpeter.

In the Wildstorm Comics series Top 10, one of the officers in the precinct is called Shock-Headed Pete, ostensibly in reference to his electrical powers.

=== Film and TV ===
Famed Golden Age cinema actor Peter Lorre (born László Löwenstein) was said to have gotten the name Peter after a theater director noted that he bore a resemblance to the children's book character.

In a 1991 edition of the Thames Television detective series Van der Valk, entitled "Doctor Hoffman's Children," the detective, played by Barry Foster, solves a series of murders after finding the book in the bedroom of his house, when his wife relates the tale of the scissorman to their granddaughter. The murders were all done in the style of events in the book.

Brief references are made to the book in the film Woman in Gold (2015), when the central character reminisces about her youth in Vienna during the Anschluss.

The Office references the book in Season 2, Episode 18: "Take Your Daughter to Work Day" (2006). Dwight Schrute reads The story of Johnny head-in-the-air and The story of the thumb sucker to the children, but is interrupted by a horrified Michael Scott.

Family Guy references the "Story of Little Suck-a-Thumb" in a cutaway gag in "Business Guy," the ninth episode in the eighth season, produced in 2009.

In Doctor Who Season 10 Episode 3 "Thin Ice" (2017), The Doctor reads part of "The Story of the Thumb-Sucker" to the children of 1814 London.

=== Music ===
German band Rammstein included the song "Hilf Mir" "(Help Me)" on their album Rosenrot (2005) It is about a child whose parents are not at home. She discovers matches and sets herself on fire and burns completely. In the story, the girl's name is Pauline.

XTC were influenced by "The Story of the Thumb-Sucker" when they wrote "Scissor Man". from 1979's Drums and Wires.

The British post-punk band Shock Headed Peters, formed in 1982, took their name from the story.

American post-punk band Slovenly used the popular cover illustration of Struwwelpeter for the cover of their 1987 album, Riposte, on SST Records.

== References to health conditions ==
The author, Heinrich Hoffmann, worked as a physician and later on as psychiatrist. Some of his stories describe habits of children, which can be in extreme forms signs of mental disorders. Attention deficit hyperactivity disorder is called Zappel-Philip-Syndrom (Fidgety-Philip syndrome) colloquially in Germany. The story of the Suppen-Kaspar (Soup-Kaspar) is a case example of anorexia nervosa. Uncombable hair syndrome is also called Struwwelpeter syndrome, after the book title.

== See also ==
- Max and Moritz
- Mrs. Piggle-Wiggle
- The Gashlycrumb Tinies
