= Little Suck-a-Thumb =

Short film

Little Suck-a-Thumb (1992) is a short film by David Kaplan.

The film is a psychoanalytic interpretation of Heinrich Hoffman's Struwwelpeter. It stars Cork Hubbert (The Ballad of the Sad Café), Evelyn Solann, and Jim Hilbert as the Great Tall Scissorman.

Little Suck-a-Thumb won awards at the 1992 Chicago Film Festival, the 1992 Cork Film Festival, and the 1993 Grenoble Film Festival. It was also awarded 2nd place at the NYU Tisch School of the Arts annual film festival and was shown as an Official Selection at the 1992 Munich International Festival of Film Schools. It has been used as instructional material for film students.
