= Red Riding Hood (disambiguation) =

Red Riding Hood may refer to:

== Films ==
- Red Riding Hood (1901 film), a French silent film directed by Georges Méliès
- Red Riding Hood (1989 film), an Israeli-American live-action musical fantasy film directed by Adam Brooks
- Red Riding Hood (2003 film), an Italian horror film
- Red Riding Hood (2006 film), an American musical film
- Red Riding Hood (2011 film), an American dark fantasy film

== Other uses ==
- Red Riding Hood (Once Upon a Time), a character from the television series Once Upon a Time
- Red Riding Hood, a cultivar of Mandevilla sanderi, a plant also called Dipladenia sanderi and Brazilian jasmine

== See also ==
- Red Riding Hood Rides Again, a 1941 Color Rhapsody cartoon directed by Sid Marcus
- Red Hot Riding Hood, a 1943 MGM cartoon directed by Tex Avery
- Red Riding Hoodwinked, a 1955 Looney Tunes cartoon directed by Friz Freleng
- Red Riding Hoodlum, a 1957 Woody Woodpecker cartoon directed by Paul Smith
- Little Red Riding Hood (disambiguation)
