= Ethel Jackson =

American actress

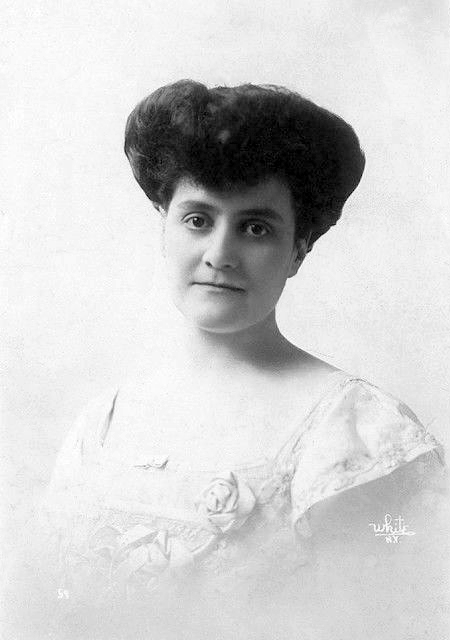
- Ethel Jackson in 1907.
- Born: Ethel Hart Jackson; November 1, 1877; Berlin, Germany
- Died: November 23, 1957 (aged 80); Vienna, Austria
- Occupation: Actress
- Years active: 1898–1928

Ethel Jackson (November 1, 1877 – November 23, 1957) was a United States actress and comic prima donna of the late 19th and early 20th centuries. She appeared in Broadway theatrical productions, creating the title role in the original Broadway production of The Merry Widow.

== Family ==
In 1877, Ethel Jackson was born on November 1 in New York and lived for an extended time abroad. She received her education in Vienna, Austria and Paris, France. Her father was N. Hart Jackson, a dramatist responsible for adapting The Two Orphans into a smash play. Her full name was Ethel Hart Jackson. Her mother was Mrs. Frances Wyatt Jackson. Frances was in the cast of The Ambassador which was staged at the St. James Theatre in London, England, in 1898. Jackson was the great-granddaughter of painter Henry Inman and Sir William Coddington, the first governor of Rhode Island.

== Theatrical career ==
She first played small roles at the Savoy Theatre before having her first hit there as Wanda in The Grand Duchess. Charles Frohman brought her to America to play the leading lady in Little Miss Nobody at the Garden Theatre in New York City, in August 1898. She was engaged to perform the part by A.H. Al Canby, who represented Frohman. The musical comedy was staged next at Nixon & Zimmerman's Broad Street (Philadelphia) Theatre in September. The plot deals with a young aristocrat who is trying to raise funds when he finds himself without money. He places an advertisement for boarders at the Scottish castle of his aunt who is away. His ad is answered by a man who runs a London music hall. He brings along three music hall girls and a variety artist. The five are forced to pass themselves off as members of the nobility.

Following her tenure in Little Miss Nobody, Jackson joined the Augustin Daly musical company. She was in the musical farce, The Hotel Topsy Turvy, which opened at the Herald Square Theatre on October 3, 1898. As Cecile, Jackson's fellow cast members included Marie Dressler, who demonstrates her versatility along with her noted talent for humor. Jackson succeeded Katherine Florence in the Madison Square Stock Company.

By April 1899 she was in the company of A Runaway Girl. The production began with a show in Troy, New York on September 18. James T. Powers played the role of Flipper, the jockey.

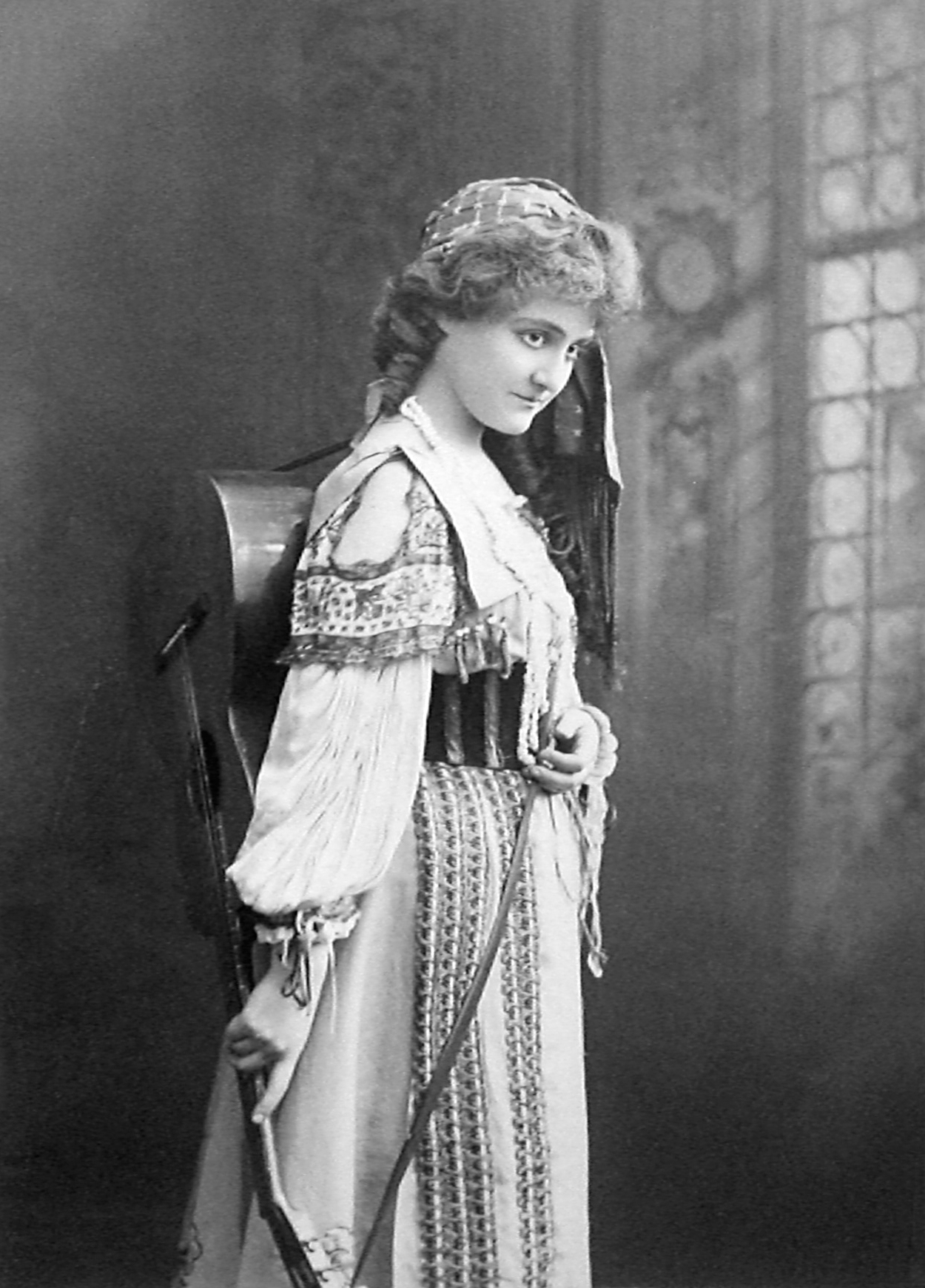
Ethel Jackson in Miss Bob White (1901)

Jackson starred as the title character in George T. Richardson's musical Little Red Riding Hood; a work which premiered on Christmas Eve 1899 at the Boston Museum. She remained with the production when it transferred to Broadway's Casino Theatre in January 1900. Jackson was 'Riding Hood', with Madge Lessing as 'Little Boy Blue' and Kitty Mitchell as 'Little Jack Horner'. The production was the work of Edward E. Rice. In 1901, Jackson created the title role in Miss Bob White, a comic opera written by Willard Spenser. The story tells of two millionaires compelled to live for several months as tramps after losing an election bet. They come to a dairy farm close to Philadelphia and are put to work. Jackson is a New York society belle who arrives at the farm disguised as a dairy maid. She successfully woos the man she is infatuated with.

In February 1905 she was in a production of The Brixton Burglary at the Carnegie Lyceum in Manhattan. Written by Frederick W. Sidney, the presentation could not be staged in Brooklyn, New York, because of the burning of the Brooklyn Academy of Music. Several hundred members and friends of the Amaranth, Brooklyn's oldest dramatic society, attended the performance. She starred in The Blue Moon on Broadway in 1906.

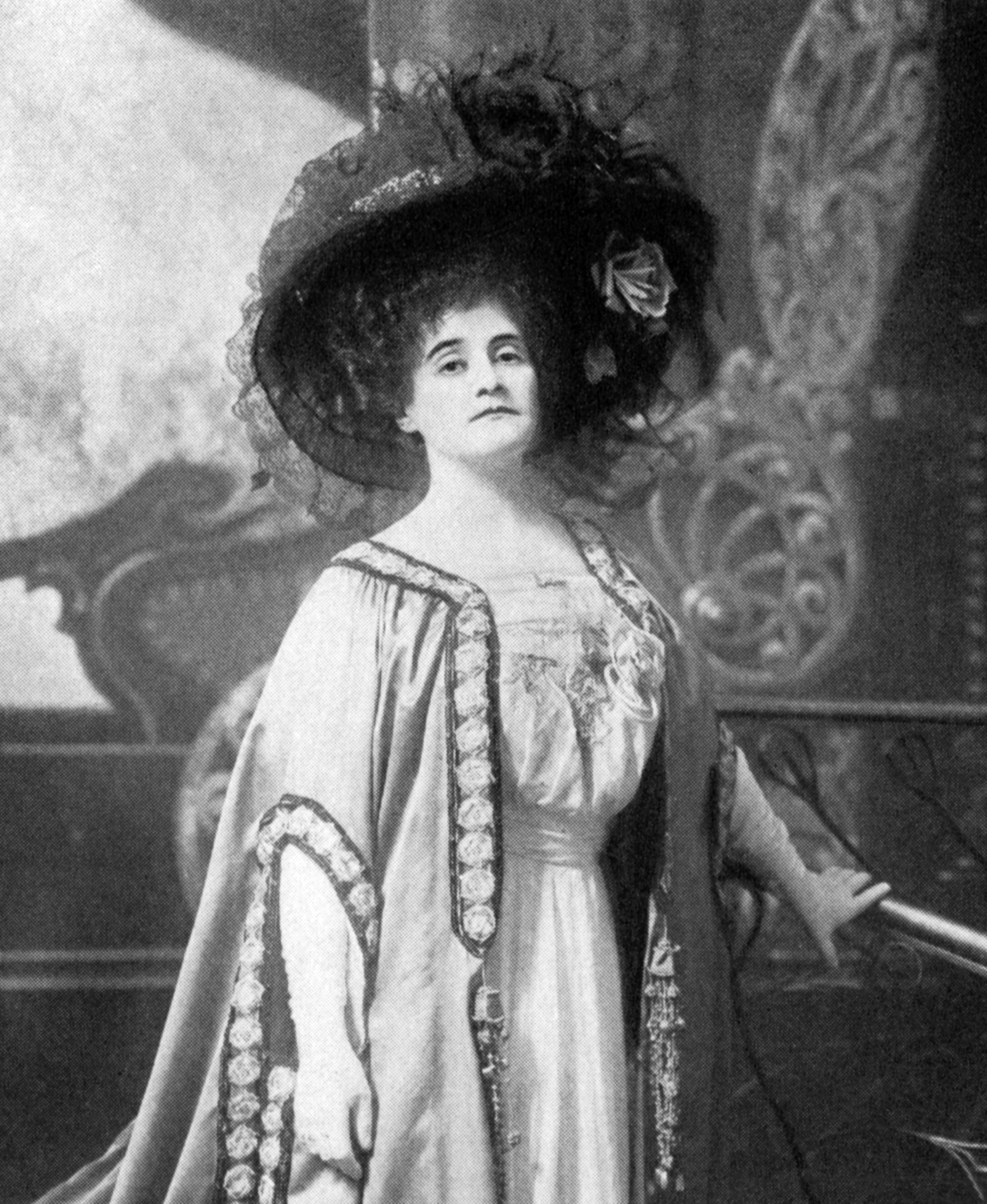
Ethel Jackson in the original Broadway production of The Merry Widow (1907)

Henry W. Savage secured Jackson to sing the role of Sonia in the original Broadway production of The Merry Widow. The Viennese comic opera was written by Victor Leon, Franz Lehár and Leo Stern. The production opened first in Syracuse, New York, on September 24, 1907. The three-act opera played the New Amsterdam Theatre for the first time on October 21. Jackson fainted twice during a Saturday matinee in March 1908. Her illness brought about her replacement by Lois Ewell. She fainted again while leaving the stage at the close of the second act on March 17. After being revived by a doctor, Jackson resumed her role at the beginning of the third act. The audience enthusiastically applauded her for her determination. She attributed her fainting spells to a weak heart caused by grippe, which she suffered from during the previous winter.

In January 1914, Jackson debuted as a vaudeville performer at the Orpheum Theatre in Brooklyn, New York. The venue was run by B.F. Keith. In February 1915 she appeared in A Pair of Sixes with Ralph Herz at the Belasco Theatre in Washington, D.C. The play dealt with two pillmakers who disagreed on how to conduct their business.

== Marriages ==
Jackson married J. Fred Zimmerman Jr., business manager of the Chestnut Street Theater, in 1902 at St. James Episcopal Church in Philadelphia. She retired for a number of years from performing at this time. Zimmerman was the son of the junior partner of the Nixon & Zimmerman theatrical business. They spent their honeymoon in Lakewood, New Jersey. The couple resided for a time on West 56th Street before moving to the Hotel Seymour, West 45th Street, midtown Manhattan. Jackson denied rumors of a pending divorce from Zimmerman in March 1908. On August 3, 1908 Jackson obtained an interlocutory decree for a divorce without a co-respondent being named. According to the stipulation of the final divorce decree, issued in October, Jackson was permitted to remarry. Zimmerman could not legally marry again while his former wife was still living. In October 1910 it was disclosed that Zimmerman was married again and had been for some time. His wife was Grace Rankin, a member of the Miss Innocence company of Anna Held.

Newspaper reports announced the impending marriage of Jackson to Benoni Lockwood Jr., her lawyer when she was contesting a divorce from Zimmerman. Lockwood was from an old New York family and a popular member of the Racquet Club. His father married a sister of the late Ambassador Thomas F. Bayard, Sr. of Delaware, and was one of the pioneer insurance men in New York City. Their wedding occurred on October 26, 1908 in Chestnut Hill, Pennsylvania, at the home of Henry Wharton, a brother-in-law of Lockwood. Lockwood's residence was 9½ East 33rd Street, New York City.

== Death ==
Ethel Jackson died on November 23, 1957, in East Islip, Long Island, New York.

== Filmography ==
- The Battle of the Weak - Paula Thurston (1914)
- Drums of Love - Bit Role (1928)
