= Lango =

Lango may refer to:

== Africa ==
- Lango Kingdom, traditional monarchy of the Lango people
- Lango sub-region, previously known as Lango District, Uganda
- Lango people, of Uganda
  - Lango language (Uganda), their language
- Lango people (South Sudan)
  - Lango language (South Sudan), their language
- Didinga people of Sudan
  - Didinga language

== Asia ==
- Lango tribe, Pakistan

== Europe ==
- Lángos, a Hungarian-style fried bread
- Lango, the Venetian and Genoese name for the Greek island of Kos
- Langø Island, Denmark

== Other uses ==
- Lango (app), an icon-based messaging app
