= Lango (app) =

Israeli mobile application

Zlango, Ltd.
- Messaging unleashed
- Company type: Private
- Industry: Computer software
- Founded: 2004 (Israel)
- Headquarters: 3 Tvuot ha'Aretz, Tel-Aviv, Israel
- Key people: Yoav Lorch, Founder; Roni Haim, CEO; Alon Greenberg, CFO
- Products: Zlango mobile, Zlango ICQ plug-in
- Number of employees: 40
- Website: www.zlango.com

Lango, originally known as Zlango, was an icon-based "language" (actually a logographic writing system) built for web and mobile messaging. Zlango Ltd., the Israeli company which created and owned Zlango, released a Java and Brew application for mobile phones that used the Zlango icon language to create a new form of SMS, called ZMS, using Zlango's icons instead of words.

== Background ==
Zlango was created in 2004 by Yoav Lorch, an author and playwright, as an attempt to shorten text messages. When he found that abbreviated texts only removed 20% of letters, he decided to enter the field of pictographic language. The name Zlango is a combination of lingo, slang, and language, with the letter Z as homage to Esperanto creator L. L. Zamenhof. In February 2007, Zlango Ltd. announced that it raised $12 million from the VCs Benchmark and Accel. Zlango Ltd. was based in Tel Aviv and had around 40 employees at its peak. The company ceased to operate in 2014.

== Lango around the world ==
Zlango's products were released in many countries, as well as over the Web, in many forms.

Zlango's mobile application was released in the following territories:

- Albania with the operator AMC
- Caribbean with the operator LIME (formerly bmobile - Subsidiary of Cable & Wireless Communications)
- Hong Kong with the operator SmartTone-Vodafone
- Israel with the operators Pelephone, Orange, and Cellcom
- Philippines with the operator Globe
- Poland with the operators Play, and Bauer
- Portugal with the operator TMN
- Switzerland with the operator Swisscom
- Ukraine with the operator Kyivstar

Apart from Zlango's website, Zlango also had an ICQ plug-in in several languages and countries that allowed to use Zlango icons to chat with the contacts.

Zlango also appeared in the Israeli Children's Channel as a game show.

== The language ==
Zlango included more than 300 icons in several different categories. The icons are not definitive, and most icons have multiple meanings: for example, the icon for "me" can also mean "I", the icon for "go" can also mean "come", and the icon for "car" can also mean "drive". The meanings that Zlango intended for each icon were only suggestions as Zlango encouraged users to invent their own personal meanings for icons.

According to Zlango Ltd., the Zlango icons were created to be memorable, rather than recognizable. For example, the "want" icon is a bird in a nest, but once you learn of the icon's meaning, it is difficult to forget.

Zlango released several Zlango versions of classic stories which showed the potential for more than just picture messaging:

- Little Red Riding Hood
- Romeo & Juliet
- Genesis
- Adam and Eve
- The Tower of Babel

== See also ==
- Blissymbols
- Isotype
- Characteristica universalis
