= J. Fred Zimmerman Jr. =

John Frederick Zimmerman Jr.
- Born: 27 August 1871
- Died: 12 December 1948
- Occupations: Theater manager and producer

(no relation of the film director Fred Zinnemann) John Frederick Zimmerman Jr. (27 August 1871 – 12 December 1948) was an American theater manager and stage producer.

== Life ==
John Frederick Zimmerman was born on 27 August 1871, son of J. Fred Zimmerman Sr. (1843–1925) and Emma A Wetherell. His father was a Philadelphia-based theater magnate, known for his role in the Theatrical Syndicate. J. Fred Jr. became manager of the Chestnut Street Theater in Philadelphia, and later managed vaudeville theaters and cinemas.

Zimmerman married the actress Ethel Jackson in 1902 at St. James Episcopal Church in Philadelphia. On August 3, 1908 Jackson obtained an interlocutory decree for a divorce without a co-respondent being named. According to the stipulation of the final divorce decree, issued in October 1908, Jackson was permitted to remarry but Zimmerman could not legally remarry while his former wife was still living. In October 1910 it was disclosed that Zimmerman was married again and had been for some time. His wife was Grace Rankin, a member of the Miss Innocence company of Anna Held.

In 1919 John Golden arranged a meeting with his fellow producers Fred Zimmerman, Archibald Selwyn, Florenz Ziegfeld Jr., Winchell Smith and L. Lawrence Weber with the goal of cooperating on common issues such as censorship and ticket speculation. He wanted to set up a forum so the producers could share ideas, and wanted stop the rival organizations poaching each other's stars. This led to formation of the Producing Managers' Association, which may have inadvertently shown actors the value of organizing into the Actors' Equity Association.

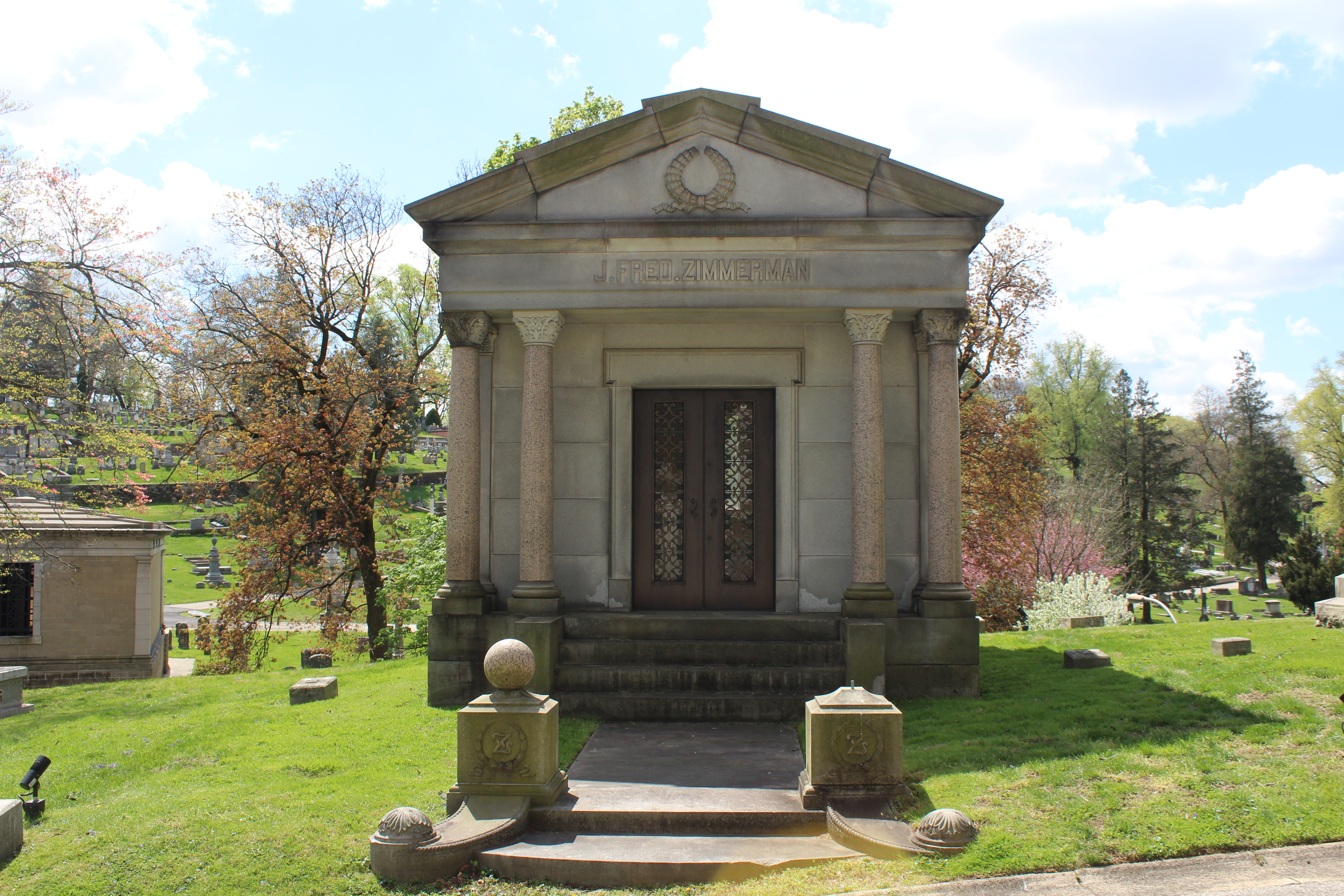
Zimmerman Family mausoleum in Laurel Hill Cemetery

J. Fred Zimmerman Jr. died in 1948 and was interred at Laurel Hill Cemetery in Philadelphia.

== Works ==
J. Fred Zimmerman Jr. produced:

- The Measure of a Man (1906)
- Inside the Lines (1915)
- Pals First (1917)
- This Way Out (1917)

== Sources ==
- Bloom, Ken (2003-12-04). Broadway: An Encyclopedia. Routledge. ISBN 978-1-135-95020-0.
- "Divorce For Ethel Jackson". The New York Times. 4 August 1908.
- "Ethel Jackson divorced". New York Times. 23 October 1908.
- "Ethel Jackson Married". New York Times. 4 February 1902.
- "J. Fred Zimmerman". IBDB.
- "J. Fred Zimmerman Married Again". New York Times. 1 October 1910.
