= Ye Xian =

Chinese fairy tale written by Duan Chengshi

"Ye Xian" (traditional Chinese: 葉限; simplified Chinese: 叶限; pinyin: Yè Xiàn; Wade–Giles: Yeh Hsien; [jê ɕjɛ̂n]) is a Chinese fairy tale that is similar to the European Cinderella story, the Malay-Indonesian Bawang Putih Bawang Merah tale, and stories from other ethnic groups including the Tibetans and the Zhuang. It is one of the oldest known variants of Cinderella, first published in the Tang dynasty compilation Miscellaneous Morsels from Youyang written around 850 by Duan Chengshi. Chinese compilations attest several versions from oral sources.

== Plot ==
Long before the Qin and Han dynasty, in a village located somewhere in the southern area, their chief by the name of Wu had two wives by custom and a daughter by each of them. Ye Xian is Wu's daughter of one wife, and she is extremely beautiful, kind and gentle, and gifted in many skills such as pottery and poetry. In contrast, her stepsister Jun-Li is plain-looking, cruel and selfish, and both she and her mother, Wu's other wife Jin, envy the attention Wu lavishes upon Ye Xian. Ye Xian's mother died while she was still a baby, so Wu did all he could to raise his motherless daughter.

Unfortunately, Ye Xian's father dies from a local plague, and a new chieftain is appointed to take his place, as Wu had no sons. With her family reduced to poverty, Ye Xian is forced to become a lowly servant and work for her unloving and cruel stepmother, Jin, and spoiled and lazy younger half-sister Jun-Li. Despite living a life burdened with chores and housework and suffering endless abuse at her stepmother's hands, she finds solace when she ends up befriending a beautiful, 10 foot (3.0 m) fish in the lake near her home, with golden eyes and scales. The fish was really a guardian spirit sent to her by her own mother, who never forgot her daughter even beyond the grave.

One day, Jun-Li follows Ye Xian to the lake, and discovers her talking to the fish. Angry that Ye Xian has found happiness, she tells her mother everything that she had seen. The cruel Jin tricks Ye Xian into giving her the tattered dress she wears, and by this, catches and kills the fish and serves it for dinner for herself and Jun-Li. Ye Xian is devastated until an old man's spirit, possibly one of her ancestors or her maternal grandfather, in a white robe with white hair, appears and tells her to bury the fishbones in four pots and hide each pot at the corners under her bed. The spirit also tells her that whatever she needs will be granted if she talks to the bones.

Once a year, the New Year Festival is to be celebrated; this is also the time for young maidens to meet potential husbands. Not wishing to spoil her own daughter's chances, the stepmother forces her stepdaughter to remain home and clean their cave-house. After her stepfamily has left for the festival, Ye Xian is visited by the fish's spirit again. She makes a silent wish to the bones, and Ye Xian finds herself clothed magnificently in a gown of sea-green silk, a cloak of kingfisher feathers, and a pair of tiny golden slippers.

Ye Xian goes to the festival by foot. She is admired by everyone, in particular the young men who believe her to be a princess and enjoys herself until she hears Jun-Li call out to the crowd, "That girl looks like my older sister!" Realizing that her stepfamily might have recognized her, Ye Xian leaves, accidentally leaving behind a golden slipper. When she arrives home, she hides her finery and the remaining slipper under her bed. The fish bones are silent now, however, for they warned Ye Xian before not to lose even one of her slippers. Sadly, she falls asleep under a tree. Her stepfamily returns from the festival and mention a mysterious beauty who appeared at the festival but is unaware that it is Ye Xian they are speaking of.

The golden slipper is found by a local peasant who trades it, and it is passed on to various people until it reaches the hands of the nearby king of the To'Han islets, a powerful kingdom covering thousands of small islands. Fascinated by the shoe's small size, he issues a search to find the maiden whose foot will fit into the shoe and proclaims he will marry that girl. The search extends until it reaches the community of the cave-dwellers, and every maiden, even Jun-Li, tries on the slipper: but no one's foot can fit the shoe. Despondent that he cannot find the woman he was searching for, the king makes a great pavilion and places the shoe there on display. Ye Xian arrives there late in the evening to retrieve the slipper but is mistaken as a thief. Ye Xian is then brought before the king, and there she tells him everything about her life, how she lost her friend, the gold-eyed fish, and now her slipper. The king, struck by her good-nature and beauty even though she lives in the land of the savages, believes her and allows her to go home with the slipper.

The next morning, the king goes to Ye Xian's house and asks her to come with him to his kingdom. Ye Xian then wears both her shoes and appears in her beautiful sea-green gown. Jin and Jun-Li, however, insist that Ye Xian could not have clothes of that kind, for she is only their slave. Jin says that the finery is Jun-Li's, and that Ye Xian stole them. The king dismisses her lies and invites Ye Xian to marry him and live at his palace. She accepts, but her cruel stepfamily is left with the worst possible fate: each other. The stepmother forces Jun-Li, who has lost all hope of marrying rich, into the same state of servitude that Ye Xian suffered for so many years. When Jun-Li promptly and bitterly rebels against her lot, it starts a violent quarrel, the result of which is a cave-in that buries both women and destroys their home. Meanwhile, the king takes Ye Xian's hand in marriage and makes her his queen.

=== Alternate endings ===
In another version of this story, the stepmother and the stepsister were buried in a shrine called "The Tomb of the Regretful Women". These two women became goddesses in later tradition and have the power to grant anyone's wish. After Ye-Xian's marriage with the king, her husband became greedy and abused the fishbone's powers, until it stopped yielding any magic soon after. The queen Ye-Xian, thus, buried the fishbones in a nearby beach, with a great quantity of gold. A year later the king's people led a revolt, and in order to appease them, the king tried to dig the fishbones and distribute the gold to the rebelling soldiers. But the gold was washed away by the tide, along with the magical bones, and the fate of the king and Ye-Xian after the siege remains unknown.

Another version of the story finds Ye-Xian's new husband bringing her stepfamily to live with them at his palace. There is a catch, however: Jin and Jun-Li must cater to the whims of his queen and himself, and to the eventual whims of their children and heirs. Otherwise, Jun-Li and Jin will be cast out among the populace...who, knowing of the pair's ghastly natures, will surely rip them both to pieces on sight. And so poetic justice prevails: Ye-Xian's stepfamily find themselves trapped in servitude, surrounded by the lifestyle of royalty to which they aspired; they are in it, and of it, but they will never have it. Rather, it has them instead.

== Analysis ==
=== Tale type ===
According to scholarship, the tale resembles the widespread fairy tale of Cinderella, especially in regards to two elements: the shoe marriage test and the punishment of the step-family.

In his first catalogue of Chinese folktales, devised by folklorist Wolfram Eberhard in 1937, Eberhard abstracted a Chinese folktype he tentatively termed (Aschenbrödel) ("Cinderella"). In this type, indexed as number 32 in his catalogue, a beautiful maiden lives with her mean step-relatives, but a cow provides her with food and helps her in tasks; the female step-relatives kill the cow to punish the maiden, who uses the cow's bones to provide her with dresses; the maiden attends a party or festivity and marries a scholar.

==== Continuation of the story ====
According to Sinologist Boris L. Riftin, unlike European variants of Cinderella, wherein the princess marries the prince and the tale ends, Asian variants (which include those from China and Southeast Asia) segue into the revenge of the stepfamily and the heroine's replacement by her stepsister. In both Eberhard's and Ting's indexes, Chinese variants of Cinderella can segue into the heroine being drowned and going through a cycle of transformations (from bird to bamboo).

=== Motifs ===
==== The mother's reincarnation ====
According to Eberhard's index, the heroine's helper is a fish in Southern China. In Ting's index, in type 510A, "Cinderella", the heroine's helper is a fish. In the southeastern and Chinese versions of this type of story, the heroine's mother is reborn in the shape of a water animal: in the tales of the Viet, Cham, and Thai people it is almost always a fish (or shrimp), but in Han texts she turns into a bovine animal, like a cow or a buffalo.

== Adaptations ==
- Yeh-Shen: A Cinderella Story From China, retold by Ai-Ling Louie and illustrated by Ed Young, is well-known children's picture book adaptation of the fairy tale. This retelling was later adapted into an episode of animated anthology series, CBS Storybreak.
- The novel Bound by Donna Jo Napoli is a retelling of the fairy tale.
- The PBS show The Puzzle Place retold the story in the episode "Going by the Book".
- The film Year of the Fish is a modern retelling of the story.

== See also ==
- Leungli

== Selected bibliography ==
- Lai, Amy (15 March 2007). "Two Translations of the Chinese Cinderella Story". Perspectives. 15 (1): 49–56. doi:10.2167/pst004.0.
- Waley, Arthur (March 1947). "The Chinese Cinderella Story". Folklore. 58 (1): 226–238. doi:10.1080/0015587X.1947.9717844.
- Ding Naitong [in Chinese] (1974). The Cinderella cycle in China and Indo-China. Helsinki: Suomalainen Tiedeakatemia. ISBN 951-41-0121-9.
