= Year of the Fish =

- Theatrical release poster
- Directed by: David Kaplan
- Written by: David Kaplan
- Produced by: Rocco Caruso; David Kaplan
- Starring: Tsai Chin; Ken Leung; Randall Duk Kim
- Cinematography: Adam Silver
- Edited by: François Keraudren
- Music by: Paul Cantelon
- Release date: October 14, 2007 (Austin Film Festival)
- Running time: 96 minutes
- Country: United States
- Language: English

Year of the Fish is a 2007 American animated film based on Ye Xian, a ninth-century Chinese variant of the fairy tale Cinderella, starring Tsai Chin, Randall Duk Kim, Ken Leung and An Nguyen. Written and directed by David Kaplan, the film is set in a massage parlor in modern-day New York's Chinatown.

The film was executive produced by Janet Yang and produced by Rocco Caruso. Kaplan's screenplay was developed at the Sundance Screenwriters and Directors Labs and was the recipient of a 2005 Leonore Annenberg Fellowship. Year of the Fish had its world premiere at the 2007 Sundance Film Festival.

== Production ==
The film was shot entirely on location in New York City's Chinatown using live actors and then animated in post-production via rotoscoping, the process of tracing over live-action footage to create an animation; in this case, a painterly, watercolor effect. Some of the make-up on the strange-looking characters were removed by the rotoscoping.

== Reception ==
On the review aggregator website Rotten Tomatoes, 61% of 23 critics' reviews are positive, with an average rating of 5.8/10. The website's consensus reads: "This modernized and rotoscope-animated update on the Cinderella story is charming at times and visually impressive, but audiences may find it to be too coarse for children and too superficial for adults." Metacritic, which uses a weighted average, assigned the film a score of 53 out of 100, based on 13 critics, indicating "mixed or average" reviews.

Year of the Fish premiered as the Official Selection of the 2007 Sundance Film Festival and was named "Best Film" at the 2007 Avignon Film Festival. It was also named "Best Film" at the 2007 Asheville Film Festival, won the Audience Award at the 2007 Independent Film Festival of Boston, and was nominated for the Piaget Producers Award at the 2009 Independent Spirit Awards.
