= Today's Special (film) =

- Theatrical release poster
- Directed by: David Kaplan
- Screenplay by: Aasif Mandvi; Jonathan Bines
- Based on: Sakina's Restaurant by Aasif Mandvi
- Produced by: Nimitt Mankad; Lillian LaSalle; Declan Baldwin
- Starring: Aasif Mandvi; Madhur Jaffrey; Naseeruddin Shah; Harish Patel; Jess Weixler; Kevin Corrigan; Dean Winters; Ajay Naidu
- Cinematography: David Tumblety
- Edited by: Rich Fox; Chris Houghton
- Music by: Stephane Wrembel, songs by Siddhartha Khosla
- Production companies: Inimitable Pictures; Sweet 180
- Distributed by: Reliance MediaWorks Ltd
- Release date: October 16, 2009 (London Film Festival)
- Running time: 99 minutes
- Country: United States
- Language: English
- Box office: $317,831

Today's Special is a 2009 independent comedy film loosely inspired by Aasif Mandvi's play, Sakina's Restaurant. The film was directed by David Kaplan. The script was adapted by Aasif Mandvi and Jonathan Bines, and stars Mandvi, Madhur Jaffrey, Bollywood actor Naseeruddin Shah, Jess Weixler, Harish Patel, Kevin Corrigan, Dean Winters, and Ajay Naidu. The film was developed and produced by Nimitt Mankad of Inimitable Pictures, and Lillian LaSalle of Sweet 180.

The film premiered at the London Film Festival on October 16, 2009. In the United States, it was the opening film of the MIAAC Film Festival (Mahindra Indo American Arts Festival), at the Paris Theater in New York City. It played at the Mumbai Film Festival. At the Palm Springs International Film Festival on January 15, 2010, it won "Best of the Fest." It was also the Opening Night film at the San Francisco International Asian American Film Festival on March 11, 2010.

== Plot ==
Samir (Aasif Mandvi), a sous chef at an upscale New York restaurant, gets frustrated with his boss (Dean Winters) and quits after being passed over for a head chef position. His dreams of studying French cuisine in France are shattered after his father becomes ill and Samir must take over his family's Indian restaurant, Tandoori Palace in Queens. The restaurant has two chefs who don't know what they're doing, an old-fashioned wall and faltering income since the only customers are Samir's uncles sitting at a table playing cards. Samir is clueless over what to do because his knowledge of Indian cooking is limited. Then he meets the larger-than-life gourmet chef and taxi driver Akbar (Naseeruddin Shah). Samir's world is transformed via Akbar's cooking lessons, the magic of the masala and a beautiful co-worker, Carrie (Jess Weixler). Meanwhile, his mother (Madhur Jaffrey) tries to get him to settle down with a nice Indian girl and his father Hakkim (Harish Patel) is convinced his son will amount to nothing. Samir, Akbar and the kitchen staff first update the restaurant's look. Then with Akbar's eccentric help, they concoct the most magical and mouthwatering dishes in what soon becomes the best little Indian bistro in New York with booming business. Akbar, however, moves to Akron, Ohio but tells Samir that he can do it alone. Hakkim plans to sell the restaurant to an uncle but Samir, along with help from his uncles and Carrie, greatly improves business at the restaurant. Hakkim tastes his son's cooking, is impressed and decides not to sell the restaurant. Finally, Hakkim hugs his son and tells him he is proud of him.

== Cast ==
- Aasif Mandvi as Samir
- Dean Winters as Steve
- Kevin Corrigan as Stanton
- Naseeruddin Shah as Akbar
- Jess Weixler as Carrie
- Ajay Naidu as Munnamia
- Kevin Breznahan as Freddie
- Harish Patel as Hakim
- Amir Arison as Dr. Semaan
- Madhur Jaffrey as Farrida
- Ranjit Chowdhry as Regular #1
- Kumar Pallana as Regular #2

== Awards ==
- Best of the Fest Award at the 2010 Palm Springs International Film Festival
- Aasif Mandvi - Best Actor Award at the Mahindra Indo-American Arts Council (MIAAC) Film Festival
