= Little Red Riding Hood (1997 film) =

- Film poster
- Directed by: David Kaplan
- Written by: David Kaplan
- Produced by: Rocco Caruso; Jasmine Kosovic
- Starring: Christina Ricci; Timour Bourtasenkov; Quentin Crisp
- Cinematography: Scott Ramsey
- Release date: 1997
- Running time: 12 minutes
- Country: United States
- Language: English

Little Red Riding Hood is a 1997 black and white short film based on the traditional children's fairytale Little Red Riding Hood. Written and directed by David Kaplan, it features Christina Ricci in the title role and Quentin Crisp as the narrator. The short film has influences from "The Story of the Grandmother".

== Plot ==
The black-and-white short-film shows the forest of the tale.

An anthropomorphized black wolf tries to trick Little Red Riding Hood. Little Red is seen watching the wolf through the trees as he is dancing within a clearing. He notices her watching, and as Little Red walks away, he rushes up to her, asks her where is she going and what path will she take. Upon knowing her path, he gracefully runs and jumps to get to the grandmother's house before Little Red does. He successfully eats her grandmother, and then tries to eat her. However, she tricks him and survives.

== Cast ==
- Christina Ricci: Little Red Riding Hood
- Timour Bourtasenkov: The Wolf
- Evelyn Solann: The Grandmother
- Quentin Crisp: Narrator

== Themes ==
The film has been interpreted by scholar Jennifer Orme as having queer themes present throughout. She argues that Kaplan's adaptation puts into question the heteronormative interpretation of the classic Little Red Riding Hood story and invites viewers to have a queer reading of it, through various aspects of the film.

== Reception ==
=== Awards ===
- Chicago International Film Festival, 1997: Silver Hugo award – Best Narrative Short Film, David Kaplan
- Palm Springs International ShortFest, 1997: Honorable Mention – Best of Festival, David Kaplan
- Avignon Film Festival, 1998: Prix Panavision award, David Kaplan
- Avignon/New York Film Festival, 1998: Vision Award, Scott Ramsey
- Williamsburg Brooklyn Film Festival 1999: Certificate of Excellence – Best Cinematography, Scott Ramsey

== See also ==
- Red Riding Hood, a 2006 film taking another unconventional approach to the fable
- Red Hot Riding Hood, a 1943 Tex Avery cartoon emphasizing the sexual undertones of the character
