= David Kaplan (filmmaker) =

American filmmaker

David Kaplan at Telefilm Canada Features Comedy Lab

David Kaplan is the writer/director of several films based on fairy tales and folklore, including the feature film Year of the Fish (2008), which premiered at the 2007 Sundance Film Festival and was released theatrically in 2008.

Kaplan has written and directed many short films. Some of his short films include Little Suck-a-Thumb, The Frog King (1995 Sundance Film Festival), Little Red Riding Hood (1997), and LoveDeath, commissioned for Lincoln Center's 2003 New York Video Festival.

His second feature film is Today's Special (2009), a comedy set in an Indian restaurant in Jackson Heights, Queens, starring Aasif Mandvi (The Daily Show), Madhur Jaffrey (Shakespeare-Wallah) and legendary Bollywood actor Naseeruddin Shah (Monsoon Wedding).

== Filmography ==
- Play (2009 short film) - director, co-written with Eric Zimmerman
- Today's Special (2009) - director
- Little Red Riding Hood and Other Stories (2009) - writer/director
- Year of the Fish (2007) - writer/director. Year of the Fish won "Best Film" at the 2007 Avignon Film Festival, "Best Film" at the 2007 Asheville Film Festival, the Audience Award at the 2007 Independent Film Festival of Boston, and was nominated for the Piaget Producers Award at the 2009 Independent Spirit Awards
- LoveDeath (2003) - co-writer/co-director with Dan Torop & Paul Marino
- What is the City? (2002) - co-director
- Little Red Riding Hood (1997) - writer/director
- The Frog King (1994) - writer/director
- Little Suck-a-Thumb (1992) - writer/director
- The Blue Dancer (1991) - writer/director
- Happy Face (1990) - writer/director
