= Lois Ewell =

American opera singer

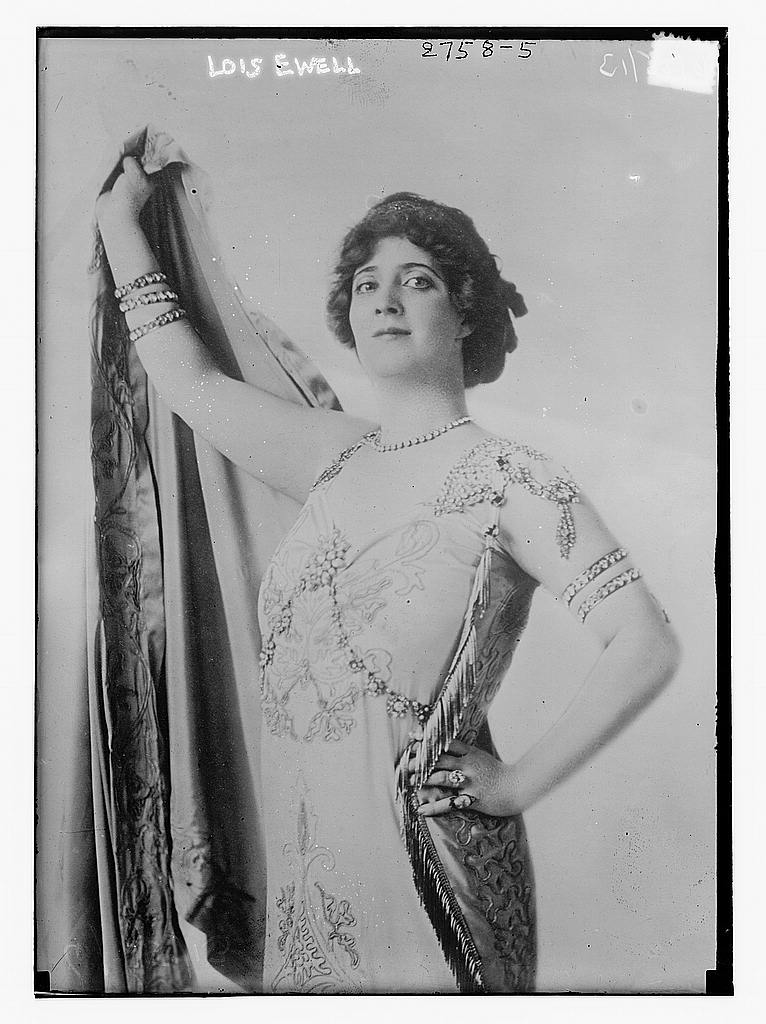
Lois Ewell circa 1913

Lois Ewell (January 28, 1885 - July 3, 1946), was an American soprano opera singer and Broadway theatre performer.

== Biography ==
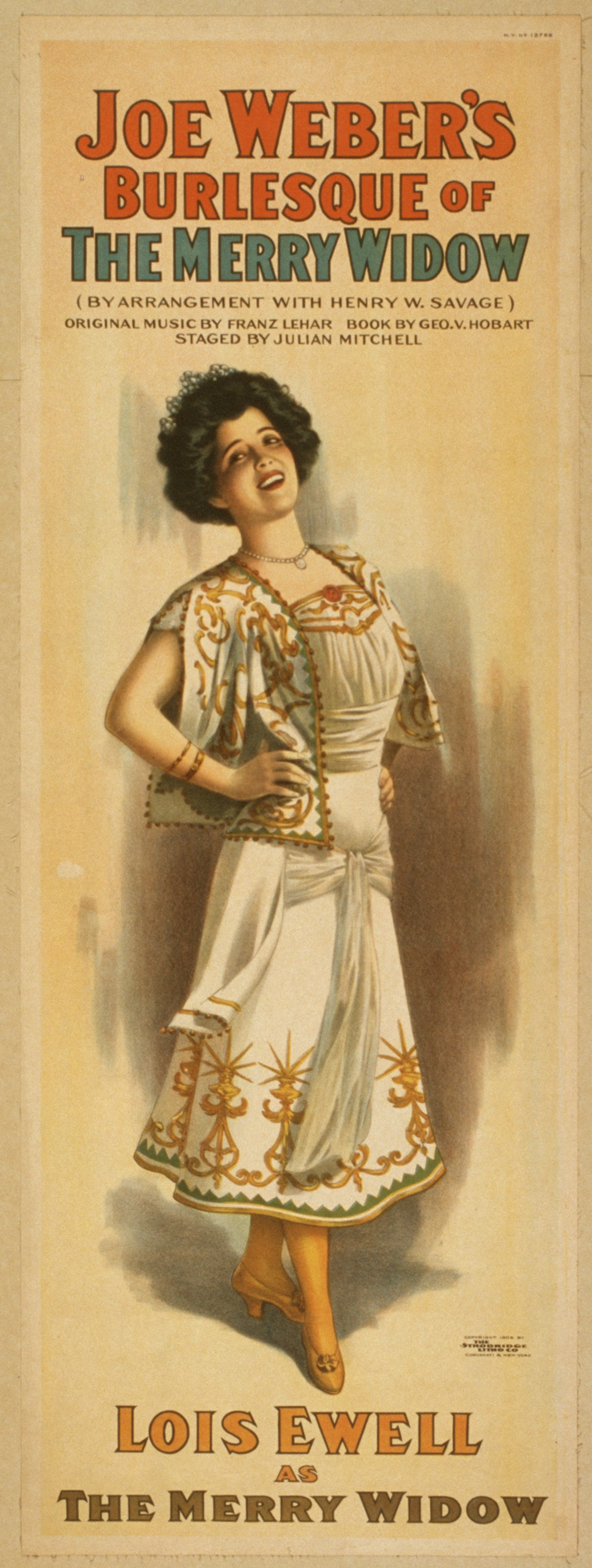
Poster of Lois Ewell as The Merry Widow (1908)

She was born on January 28, 1885, in Memphis, Tennessee to James Levi Ewell. She married Henry Ramond Tredwell of Port Washington, New York in 1905 in Brooklyn, New York.

In 1908, she starred in Joe Weber's Burlesque of The Merry Widow at the New Amsterdam Theatre in New York City.

She divorced in Chicago in 1909.

In 1913 she appeared in the Century Opera Company's production of Aida in Manhattan. In 1914 she starred in Tosca with the Century Opera Company.

She died as Lois Henderson in New York City in 1946.
