= Priscilla Galloway =

Canadian children's literature author and English teacher (1930–2018)

Priscilla Galloway (July 22, 1930 - October 28, 2018) was a Canadian children's literature author and former English teacher. She received a PhD from the University of Toronto in 1977. Her dissertation was entitled, "Sexism and the senior English literature curriculum in Ontario secondary schools."

== Awards ==
Galloway has received the following awards and recognition for her work:

- Finalist for 1999-2000 Red Cedar Book Award for Daedalus and the Minotaur
- 70th Annual New York Public Library Exhibition of Books for the Teen Age 1999 for Snake Dreamer (1999)
- Mr. Christie's Book Award finalist for Daedalus and the Minotaur
- Canadian Library Association Young Adult Book Award finalist for Truly Grim Tales 1996

== Influences ==
Galloway taught English to noted literary critic Linda Hutcheon during high school.
