= George T. Richardson =

American journalist, playwright, theatre critic and author

George Tilton Richardson (July 2, 1862 – September 11, 1938) was an American journalist, playwright, theatre critic, and author. In addition to publishing works under his own name, he also co-authored works with Wilder Dwight Quint using the pseudonym Dwight Tilton. Some of his plays were staged on Broadway. He was the long time editor of The Worcester Evening Post (now part of the Telegram & Gazette).

== Life and career ==
Born on July 2, 1862, in Boston, Massachusetts, George Tilton Richardson was the son of Nathaniel Richardson. His father was a prominent Boston lawyer. He was educated at the Boston Latin School prior to attending Boston University; graduating from the latter institution in 1887. While a student at BU he was editor of the literary journal The Beacon.

After graduating from BU, Richardson worked as city editor for the Boston Daily Advertiser and The Boston Record from 1888 to 1891. He then worked as a theatre critic for The Boston Traveller from 1892 to 1904. At this latter publication he befriended his co-worker and fellow writer Wilder Dwight Quint with whom he co-authored the play Miss Petticoats under the pseudonym Dwight Tilton. Richardson penned the book for the 1900 musical Little Red Riding Hood which was staged at Broadway's Casino Theatre. His other plays included On Satan's Mount, My Lady Daughter, Letters of a Son to His Self Made Father, A Prince of Bohemia, The Rainbow Chasers, A Self-Made Man's Wife, and Cloverdell among others.

In 1907–1908 Richardson served as editor-in-chief of The Boston Daily Tribune. He then worked as the managing editor of The Boston Traveller from 1908 to 1910. He then worked as the longtime editor of The Worcester Evening Post until his retirement in 1937.

George Tilton Richardson died on September 11, 1938, in Worcester, Massachusetts.
