= Little Red Riding Hood (musical) =

1899 musical

Little Red Riding Hood is a musical in two acts with lyrics by Harrison Ward and music by composers Edward E. Rice, Fred J. Eustis, Charles Dennée, T. W. Connor, and B. Gilbert. The musical's book was authored by playwright George T. Richardson and was loosely modeled after British pantomime versions of the classic European fairy tale of the same name. It also included characters from other classic fairy tales. It premiered on Christmas Eve 1899 at the Boston Museum, and then ran for further performances in Boston in January 1900 at the Hollis Street Theatre before transferring to Broadway.

Little Red Riding Hood premiered on Broadway at the Casino Theatre on January 8, 1900. It closed on January 20, 1900, after 24 performances. The production starred Ethel Jackson in the title role and Madge Lessing as Little Boy Blue among others. The production was produced and directed by Edward E. Rice.

== Songs ==
Act 1

- "Pretty Little Girl That I know"
- "Away, Away" (music by Charles Dennee)
- "Maypole Dance" (music by Charles Dennee)
- "Simple Simon" (music by F. J. Eustis)
- "Maypole Chorus" (music by F. J. Eustis)
- "Jack and Jill" (music by Charles Dennee; lyrics by Charles Emerson Cook)
- "A Soldier Bold" (music by E. E. Rice)
- "Naughty Boys" (music by E. E. Rice)
- "The Circus" (music by F. J. Eustis and E. E. Rice)
- "At My Time of Life" (music by T. W. Conner)
- "When Granny is Elected"
- "The Art of Love-Making"
- "The Legend of the Stork" (music by Frank Perlet)
- "Love Is an Infant" (music by Charles Dennee; lyrics by Charles Emerson Cook)
- "Little Boy Blue, Come Blow Your Horn" (music by Charles Dennee)
- "Off to the Hunt"
- "Shot and Shell" (music by E. E. Rice)

Act 2

- "Alphabet Song and Essence" (music by E. E. Rice)
- "Larry Barry" (music by E. E. Rice)
- "Susie-Ue" (music by B. Gilbert; lyrics by B. Gilbert)
- "Shadows Are Falling"
- "The Midgely's Bogie Man"
- "Nothing To Do with You"
- "Grand Toy Dances" (music by F. J. Eustis)
- "Barnyard Ballet" (music by F. J. Eustis)
- "Off to Fairyland"
