= Heinrich Hoffmann (author) =

German psychiatrist and children's writer

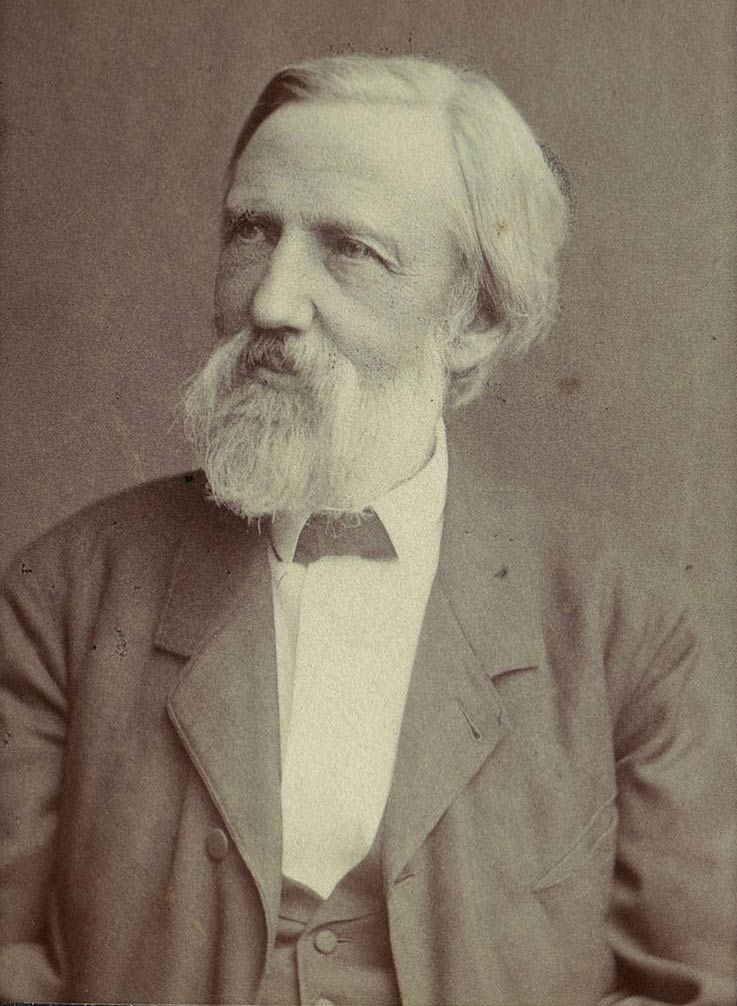
- Born: 13 June 1809; Frankfurt
- Died: 20 September 1894 (aged 85); Frankfurt
- Occupations: Psychiatrist and Author
- Writing career
- Notable work: Struwwelpeter

Heinrich Hoffmann (June 13, 1809 – September 20, 1894) was a German psychiatrist, who also wrote some short works including Der Struwwelpeter, an illustrated book portraying children misbehaving.

== Early life and education ==
Hoffmann was born in Frankfurt on Main to an architect father, Philipp Jakob Hoffmann, who was responsible for the city's streets and waterways. Hoffmann's mother died when he was a baby. His father later married his mother's sister, Antoinette Lausberg, who was a loving and more than adequate mother to him. Lazy and easily distracted, Hoffmann at first struggled at school, but became a successful student after conforming to the strict discipline imposed by his demanding father. At university in Heidelberg, he immersed himself into the corps student culture. His zest for dueling was small, but owing to his sociability, good humour and wit, Hoffmann soon became the center of many social circles, a pattern that would later repeat itself in his hometown. His progress in his medical studies was slow because of the many distractions. To flee these, he left Heidelberg for Halle, where he concentrated on his studies under Professor Peter Krukenberg, the founder of a charity clinic. His first brush with medical practice coincided with a cholera outbreak in Halle. After getting his medical degree, he intended to spend a year in Paris (funded by the Frankfurt Bethmann Bank) to improve his knowledge of surgery. Due to the deteriorating health of his father, he had to return home early.

== Family life ==
Hoffmann married Therese Donner and had three children by her, two of whom survived him, as did his wife. He was known to draw comic sketches for his children as well as for his wife. Karl Hessenberg, the mathematician, was his great-grandson.

== Professional life as a physician and psychiatrist ==
Hoffmann worked for a pauper's clinic and had a private practice. He also taught anatomy at the Senckenberg Foundation. None of this paid very well, and when the Frankfurt lunatic asylum's previous doctor (who was a friend of his) retired in 1851, he was eager to take the post even though he had no expertise in psychiatry. This changed quickly, as his later competent publications in the field show. Hoffmann portrays himself as a caring, humane psychiatrist, who strove to be the sunshine in the life of his miserable patients. His gregarious personality may well have been popular with many of them. His statistical compilations show that up to 40% of the people with acute cases of what would today be called schizophrenia were discharged after a few weeks or months and stayed in remission for years and perhaps permanently. Always a skeptic, Hoffmann voices doubts whether this was due to any therapy he may have given them. Much of his energy from 1851 onwards went into campaigning for a new, modern asylum building with gardens in the city's green belt. He was successful and the new clinic was built at the site of today's Frankfurt University's Humanities campus. (The original building was demolished in the 1920s.)

== Professional life as a writer ==
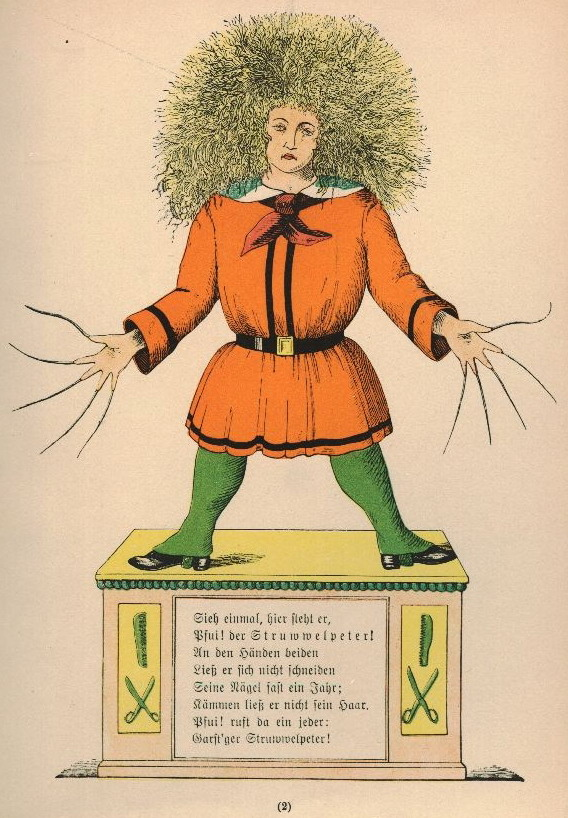
Struwwelpeter

Hoffmann published poems and a satirical comedy before, in 1845, a publisher friend persuaded him to have a collection of illustrated children's verses printed, which Hoffmann had done as a Christmas present for his son. The book, later called Struwwelpeter after one of its anti-heroes, became popular with the public and had to be reprinted regularly; many foreign translations followed. "Struwwelpeter" was not perceived as cruel or overly moral by Hoffmann's contemporaries. The original title, "Funny stories and droll pictures", indicates that entertainment was at least partly the author's intention.

After the book's success, Hoffmann felt persuaded to write other children's books, of which only the first, König Nussknacker und der arme Reinhold, became popular. He also kept on writing satires and (often comic) poems for adults. His satires show his strong skepticism towards all kinds of ideology and his distaste for religious, philosophical, or political bigotry. Even in Germany, he is today largely remembered for his Struwwelpeter.

Hoffmann was a man of liberal sympathies, campaigned for the goal of a constitutional monarchy, participated in the Vorparlament, and joined the Freemasons but later left due to their refusal to admit Jews.

== Pro-bono public activities ==
Hoffmann, a popular and well-connected figure in his hometown, became an active member of several non-political public bodies during his lifetime. Among them were the administration of the Städel and the Mozart Foundation (who funded Max Bruch, among others).

== In popular culture ==
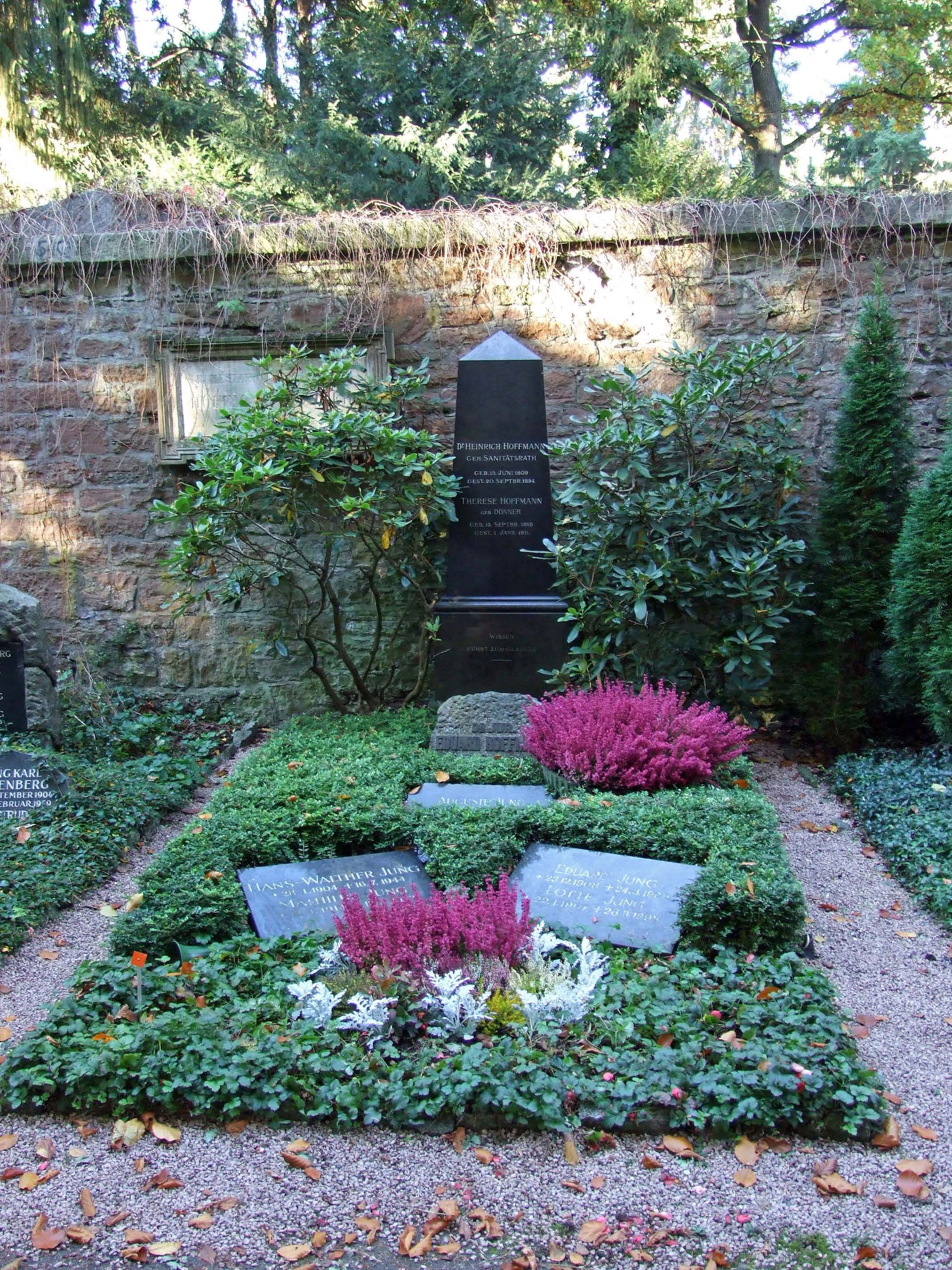
Grave, Frankfurt Hauptfriedhof

He wrote under the following names:

- Polykarpus Gastfenger (The given name is the German version of that of a Christian martyr; the surname sounds like "Gastfänger", which could be translated as "guest-catcher".)
- Heulalius von Heulenburg
- Heinrich Hoffmann
- Heinrich Hoffmann-Donner (The second half of the compound surname is the maiden name of his wife Therese. It would mean "thunder" as a common noun.)
- Heinrich Kinderlieb (The surname means roughly "child-friendly"/"nice to children")
- Reimerich Kinderlieb
- Peter Struwwel (This name reverses the order of the components of "Struwwelpeter".)
- Zwiebel (As a common noun, this would mean "onion")

In Frankfurt there is a Heinrich-Hoffmann-Museum.

He is the subject of the historical novel, 98 Reasons For Being, written by Clare Dudman.

He and his book Der Struwwelpeter are mentioned in The Office episode "Take Your Daughter to Work Day".

One of the short stories contained within Der Struwwelpeter, "Die Geschichte vom Daumenlutscher" or "The Story of Little Suck-a-Thumb" is the loose basis for the song "Scissor Man" by the British band XTC. The story involves a little boy whose punishment for sucking his thumbs is getting them cut off by the tailor. The song was more popularly covered by Primus.

Struwwelpeter's statue stands in the center of Frankfurt am Main, in Hoffmann's honour.
