= Red Riding Hood (2006 film) =

- DVD cover
- Directed by: Randal Kleiser
- Written by: Timothy Dolan
- Produced by: Steve Austin; Jonathan Bogner; David Borg; Nzinga Garvey; Lou Pearlman; Greg McDonald; Stuart E. Rawitt; Jack Serino
- Starring: Lainie Kazan; Henry Cavill; Morgan Thompson; Sam Stone; Daniel Roebuck; Debi Mazar; Joey Fatone
- Cinematography: David Stump
- Edited by: Harry Hitner
- Music by: Bruce Roberts; David Tobocman
- Production company: Tag Entertainment
- Distributed by: 7 Arts International; Cecchi Gori
- Release date: June 27, 2006
- Running time: 82 minutes
- Country: United States
- Language: English

Red Riding Hood is a 2006 American fantasy musical film starring Morgan Thompson as "Red", Henry Cavill as "the Hunter", and Joey Fatone as "the Wolf". It notably marked the film acting debut of Ben Platt before his career breakthrough in Pitch Perfect six years later.

== Plot ==
Claire, a typical teenaged girl obsessed with boy bands who is planning to sneak out and meet up with her friends is treated to the story of Little Red Riding Hood by her babysitting grandmother. She and her brother Matt repeatedly offer suggestions on how to spice up the story.

Red lives with her family in a lighthouse by the ocean. One day, Red is set to travel through the woods to her grandmother's house built on an oceanside cliff to bring her soup for her cold. Her mother warns her against using the woods as a shorter route due to the danger of a wolf therein but Red is disbelieving and uses the woods anyway.

The wolf spots Red immediately and begins stalking her. When she is mugged by the three Ashleys (modeled after the Three Billy Goats Gruff), the wolf arrives soon after and gobbles them up, discovering Red's iPod in the process. When the wolf (disguised as a man) finally closes in on Red, he is caught in a trap from which he is released by his gullible prey. Before he can devour her, however, he is scared away by the arrival of a hunter on a white horse (with a blunderbuss). Hunter warns Red against traveling the woods as the creature she had released was a werewolf, further explaining that he had eaten his parents. Again, she is disbelieving and does what she wants.

Finding herself stranded in the woods, Red calls her brother for help and prays to make it out of the woods safely. Her brother arrives but his help is inadequate and he finds himself stranded with her. The two manage to make it to their grandmother's house, but she has already been eaten and replaced by the wolf. Before he can eat Red, he is distracted by her brother and a chase ensues that nearly ends in Rusty being eaten.

Hunter arrives to help but the wolf nearly eats Rusty anyway before Red tosses a silver bullet into his mouth which he swallows. Light begins to pour out from cracks in his body and he explodes, releasing all of the people he had swallowed whole since becoming a werewolf. Amid the happy reunions, the wolf (unharmed) finds the Gypsy Fortune Teller who had cursed him (and was subsequently the first to be eaten) and convinces her to remove the curse.

Grandmother's story now ended, she offers to tell the children a sequel and Claire is convinced to stay in rather than sneak out. Claire, Grandma, and Matt order pizza which is delivered by a pizza delivery boy who resembles the Hunter from the story.

== Cast ==
- Morgan Thompson as Red / Claire
- Sam Stone as Rusty / Matt
- Lainie Kazan as Grandma
- Debi Mazar as Red's Mother
- Daniel Roebuck as Red's Father
- Joey Fatone as Jack WereWolf
- Ashley Rose Orr as Ashley Alvares-Mitchell (Ashley #1)
- Andrea Bowen as Ashley Crane (Ashley #2)
- Callie Waterman as Ashley DeWitt (Ashley #3)
- Henry Cavill as Hunter / Pizza Delivery Boy
- Cassandra Peterson as Hunter's Mother
- David Kaufman as Hunter's Father
- Suzanne Kent as The Gypsy Fortune Teller
- Sung Hi Lee as The TV Reporter
- Ben Platt as The Boy Scout
- John Paragon as The Fisherman
- Donzaleigh Abernathy as The Newscaster

== See also ==
- Adaptations of Little Red Riding Hood
