= List of animated television series of 2019 =

This is a list of animated television series first aired 2019.

Title	Seasons	Episodes	Country	Year	Original channel	Technique
1, 2, 3 Race!		26	United States	2019	BabyFIrst	CGI
101 Dalmatian Street	1	26	United Kingdom	2019–20 (Note: Sneak peeks of the show aired on Disney Channel in the UK and Ireland and other European countries in late 2018.)	Disney Channel	Toon Boom Harmony
A-Squad		52	China	2019	Tencent Video	CGI
Abby Hatcher	2	52	Canada	2019–22	TVOKids; Knowledge Network; Télé-Québec	CGI
Abraca	1	26	France	2019	Okoo	Flash
Adrian	1	9	Italy	2019	Canale 5 (Mediaset)	Flash
The Adventures of Bob Zoom	1	26	Brazil	2019	Gloobinho	Flash
The Adventures of Paddington	3	117	France; United Kingdom	2019–25	Nickelodeon	CGI
The Adventures of Peter and Wolf	4	108	Russia	2019–present	Ivi.ru; Kinopoisk	Flash
Aeko & Friends	1	26	South Korea	2019–20	EBS1	CGI
Aesop Lion in Aesop's Fables		2	United States	2019	YouTube	Flash
Agent Binky: Pets of the Universe	3	78	Canada	2019–24	Treehouse TV	CGI
The Alien Guide to Earth	1	10	United States	2019	VRV	Flash
Alien News Desk	1	12	United States	2019	Syfy	Flash/Traditional
Alif & Sofia	2	104	Malaysia	2019–21	YouTube	CGI
Alphabet Street	1	26	Australia	2019	Disney Junior	Flash
Amphibia	3	58	United States	2019–22	Disney Channel	Traditional
Angry Birds MakerSpace	3	40	Finland	2019–25	YouTube	Flash (season 1); CGI (seasons 2–3)
Animal Mechanicals (Webseries)	1	15	United Kingdom	2019	YouTube	CGI
Animal Rescue	1	52	South Korea	2019–20	KBS1	CGI
Antiks	1	52	Singapore	2019	YouTube	CGI
Apollo's Tall Tales	1	52	France	2019	France 5	CGI
Archibald's Next Big Thing	6	50	United States	2019–21	Netflix (2019–20); Peacock (2021)	Flash
Baby Toot Toot			India; United States	2019–present	YouTube	CGI
Barbapapa: One Big Happy Family!	1	52	France	2019	TF1	Traditional/Flash
Berry Bees	1	52	Italy; Australia; Ireland; India; Singapore	2019–21	Rai Gulp; 9Go!	Flash
Best Bugs Forever	1	52	France	2019–present	Disney Channel	Traditional/Flash
Best Furry Friends	1	13	Australia	2019–present	Boomerang	CGI
Bhaagam Bhaag	1	52	India	2019	Disney Channel	
Bigfoot	1	12	United States; Canada	2019	VRV	Flash
The Bizarre Stories of Professor Zarbi	2	54	Canada	2019–22	Télétoon la nuit Adult Swim	Flash
Bless the Harts	2	34	United States	2019–21	Fox	Flash
Blinky and Knobby	1	26	Russia	2019	Ivi.ru	CGI
Blue's Clues & You!	5	90	United States; Canada	2019–24	Nickelodeon (2019–23); Nick Jr. (2023–24); Treehouse TV; YouTube (2024)	CGI/Flash/Live action
Blynk & Aazoo	1	27	Canada	2019–22	TVOKids	Flash/Live action
Boy Girl Dog Cat Mouse Cheese	3	156	United States; France; Ireland	2019–24	CBBC; Gulli; Canal J Disney Channel (season 3); RTÉ2; RTÉjr; DeA Kids; Super RTL (Germany, season 3)	Flash
The Bravest Knight	2	26	Canada	2019–25	Hulu	Flash
Bread Barbershop	3	91	South Korea	2019–present	KBS1	CGI
Brogan: Master of Castles	1	6	United States	2019	VRV	Flash
Bug Diaries	1	20	United States	2019–20	Amazon Prime Video	CGI/Flash
Bugsbot Ignition	1	26	South Korea	2019–20	Tooniverse	Traditional/CGI
Cake	5	47	United States	2019–21	FXX	Flash/Live action
Canciones del Zoo La Serie	1	12	Argentina	2019–present	YouTube	CGI
Cannon Busters	1	12	Japan	2019	Netflix	Traditional
Care Bears: Unlock the Magic	1	49	United States; Canada	2019–24	Boomerang; Cartoon Network	Flash
Carmen Sandiego	4	32	Canada; United States	2019–21	Netflix	Flash
The Casagrandes	3	70	United States	2019–22	Nickelodeon	Toon Boom Harmony
Chacha Chaudhary	1		India	2019	Disney Channel India; Hungama TV	
The Charlie Shepherd Show		52	Brazil	2019–present	Discovery Kids	Flash
Charlie's Colorforms City	6	34	United States; Canada	2019–22	Netflix	CGI
Chatty Toritori	5	32	South Korea	2019–present	JEI TV	CGI
ChiChi Love	1	21	Sweden	2019–22	YouTube	
Chijimon: Magic Pets	2	19	United States	2019–23	YouTube	Flash
Chortovyiki	2	20	Ukraine	2019	NLO TV; YouTube	
Clifford the Big Red Dog (2019)	3	39	United States; Canada	2019–21	Amazon Prime Video; PBS Kids	Flash
CoNaBlue			China	2019	Tencent Video	CGI
Corn & Peg	2	40	Canada	2019–20	Treehouse TV	Flash
Costume Quest	1	14	United States	2019	Amazon Prime Video	CGI/Flash
Crazy Cuckoo	1	40	United States	2019	YouTube	CGI
Critters TV			Ireland	2019–present	RTÉjr	Flash
Cueio and Friends	4	67	Brazil; United States	2019–22	YouTube	CGI
Curious Cato	1	26	South Korea	2019–20	MBC TV	
D.N. Ace	1	40	Canada	2019–20	Teletoon	Flash
DC Super Hero Girls	2	78	United States	2019–21	Cartoon Network	Flash
Dead End	1	10	Israel	2019	Kan 11	Flash
Deadly Response	1	30	China	2019	Tencent Video	CGI
The Demonic King Who Chases His Wife	3	41	China	2019–22	iQIYI	Traditional
Digiaventuras	1	16	Argentina	2019	Pakapaka	Flash
The Drawing Show	3	38	New Zealand	2019	HeiHei	Flash
DreamWorks Dragons: Rescue Riders	6	53	United States	2019–22	Netflix (2019–20); Peacock (2021–22)	CGI
Dumbotz		52	Australia	2019–present	9Go!	Flash
Epithet Erased	1	7	United States	2019	VRV	Flash
Ernest & Rebecca	1	52	France	2019–20	TF1	Flash
Fairy-teens	2	27	Russia	2019–present	Carousel	CGI
Fantasy Patrol: The Chronicles	3	78	Russia	2019–present	Moolt; YouTube	CGI/Flash
Fast & Furious Spy Racers	6	52	United States	2019–21	Netflix	CGI
Filly Funtasia	2	26	Hong Kong; Spain; China	2019–20	iQIYI	CGI
Fixi in Playland	3	40	Sweden	2019–21	Viaplay	CGI
Forky Asks a Question	1	10	United States	2019–20	Disney+	CGI
Fukrey Boyzzz			India	2019	Discovery Kids	
Garfield Originals	1	24	France; United States	2019–20	France 3 Nick.com; YouTube	Flash
Gēmusetto	2	20	United States	2019–20	Adult Swim (season 1); Toonami (season 2)	Flash
Gen:Lock	2	16	United States	2019–21	RoosterTeeth.com (2019); HBO Max (2021)	CGI
Gigablaster		52	Brazil	2019–present	Gloob	Flash
Gigantosaurus	3	78	France; Canada	2019–22	France 5 Disney Junior	CGI
GioPro Studio		322	United States	2019–25	YouTube; Newgrounds	Flash/Traditional
God Troubles Me	4	48	China	2019–present	Bilibili	Traditional
GoGo Bus	12	312	China	2019–present		CGI
Golmaal Jr.	3	300	India	2019	Nickelodeon Sonic	Flash
The Grand Lord	1	12	China	2019	iQIYI	
The Great Warrior Wall	1	40	China	2019	Youku	CGI
Green Eggs and Ham	2	23	United States	2019–22	Netflix	Traditional/Toon Boom Harmony
Guitar & Drum	1	52	Brazil; Chile	2019	Disney Junior	CGI
Harley Quinn	5	57	United States	2019–22	DC Universe (2019–20); HBO Max (2022)	Traditional
Hazbin Hotel	2	16	United States	2019, 2024–present	YouTube (pilot); Amazon Prime Video (2024–present)	Traditional
Hell Den	2	12	United States	2019–20	DrinkTV (season 1); Syfy (season 2)	Flash
Hello Ninja	4	39	United States	2019–21	Netflix	CGI
Helluva Boss	3	26	United States	2019–present	YouTube (2019–present); Amazon Prime Video (season 3)	Traditional
HobbyKids Adventures	2	27	United States	2019–20	YouTube	Flash
Human Discoveries	1	10	United States	2019	Facebook Watch	Flash
Ico Bit Zip	1	26	Brazil	2019–22	Nat Geo Kids	Flash
Immemorial Love For You	2	28	China	2019–21	iQIYI	
Infinity Train	4	40	United States	2019–21	Cartoon Network (2019–20); HBO Max (2020–21)	Traditional
Jandal Burn	2	20	New Zealand	2019	HeiHei	Flash
Journey of Long	1	26	South Korea	2019–20	KBS1	CGI
Kalle Kuchenzahn	1	7	Germany	2019	KiKa	
Kindi Kids			Australia	2019–present	YouTube	CGI
Kingdom Force	1	26	Canada	2019–20	CBC Kids; Radio-Canada	CGI
Kiri and Lou	4	104	New Zealand	2019–present	TVNZ 2	Stop motion
Labuntina	1	18	United Kingdom	2019	Sky Kids	Flash
The Last Kids on Earth	3	21	United States; Canada; France	2019–21	Netflix	Flash
Lazor Wulf	2	20	United States	2019–21	Adult Swim	Traditional (2019); Flash (2020)
The Leader	1	7	China	2019	Bilibili	
The Legend of Zeta & Ozz		20	Chile	2019	Cartoon Network	
Lego City Adventures	4	65	France; United Kingdom; Denmark; United States	2019–22	Nickelodeon (2019–20); Netflix and YouTube (2022)	CGI
Lego Hidden Side	2	20	United States	2019–20	YouTube	CGI
Lego Jurassic World: Legend of Isla Nublar	1	13	United States; Canada	2019	Family Channel; Nickelodeon	CGI
Leo da Vinci	2	104	Italy	2019–24	Rai Gulp; Rai 2	CGI
Lex & Plu: Space Taxi Drivers	2	52	Russia	2019–present	STS Kids	Flash
Ling Cage	1	16	China	2019–present	Bilibili	CGI
Littlekenny	1	6	Canada	2019	Crave	Flash
Little Seeds	4	52	United States Canada	2019–present	Biblica	Flash
Lorong Waktu	1	18	Indonesia	2019	SCTV	CGI
Love, Death & Robots	4	45	United States	2019–25	Netflix	CGI/Traditional/Flash/Stop motion
Magic Kitchen		75	Russia	2019–present	Carousel	CGI
Mao Mao: Heroes of Pure Heart	1	40	United States	2019–20	Cartoon Network	Flash
Martial Universe	4	48	China	2019–present	Tencent Video	CGI
Marvel Rising Ultimate Comics	1	6	United States	2019	YouTube	
Meta Runner	3	28	Australia	2019–22	YouTube	CGI
Middle School Moguls	1	4	United States	2019	Nickelodeon	CGI
Mighty Little Bheem	3	64	India	2019–20	Netflix	CGI
Mighty Mike	1	78	France; Canada	2019–20	France 3 Ici Radio-Canada Télé; Family Channel	CGI
Mike Nolan's Long Weekend	1	5	Australia	2019	Vimeo	
Molly of Denali	5	91	United States; Canada	2019–present	PBS Kids	Flash
Momma Named Me Sheriff	2	19	United States	2019–21	Adult Swim	Flash
Moominvalley	4	52	Finland; United Kingdom	2019–24	Yle TV2 / Yle Teema & Fem; Sky One (series 1–2); Sky Showcase (series 3–4)	CGI
Monsikids	3	78	Russia	2019–present	Carousel	CGI
Moon and Me	1	50	United Kingdom; United States	2019–20	CBeebies; Universal Kids	Stop motion/Live action
Mr. Magoo	2	150	France	2019–23	France 4 CITV; ITVX	Flash
Multerny	1	21	Russia	2019–20	TNT	
Mythteria	2	52	South Korea	2019–24	EBS1	
Mytikah - O Livro dos Heróis	1	13	Brazil	2019	TV Brasil	Flash
Nebezpechna zona	2	18	Ukraine	2019–20	NLO TV	
Nick the Inventor		79	Russia	2019–present	Carousel	CGI
Nina and the Guardians	1	26	Brazil	2019–present	Nat Geo Kids	Flash
Ninjin	1	22	Brazil	2019–20	Cartoon Network	Flash
Norman Picklestripes	1	52	United Kingdom	2019–21	Universal Kids	Stop motion
Oko Lele	6	119	United States	2019–present	YouTube	CGI
Ollie		52	Belgium; Ireland	2019–present	RTÉjr	
Ollie & Scoops	1	10	United States	2019–present	YouTube	Flash
Oye Golu			India	2019	Disney Channel	
Panda and Rooster	1	52	China; Portugal	2019	CCTV-14	CGI
Pinkfong Wonderstar	3	71	South Korea	2019–present	KBS2	CGI
Pinky Malinky	3	60	United States	2019	Netflix	Toon Boom Harmony
Pipilu Rangers	3	104	China; South Korea	2019	EBS1	CGI
Pocoyo: Nursery Rhymes	1	104	Spain; United Kingdom	2019	Clan TVE	CGI
The Polos	1	52	Canada	2019–20	Discovery Family	CGI
Power Players	1	78	United States; France	2019–21	Cartoon Network; France 4	CGI
Primal	3	30	United States	2019–present	Adult Swim	Traditional
Quimbo's Quest	1	26	New Zealand	2019	10 Peach; TVNZ	Flash
Rainbow Butterfly Unicorn Kitty	1	26	United States	2019	Nickelodeon (episodes 1 and 6–15); Nicktoons (episodes 2–5 and episode 16–26)	Flash
The Remarkable Mr. King	1	13	Canada	2019	Treehouse TV	Flash
Rescue Heroes	1	14	United States	2019	YouTube	Traditional/Flash
Rev & Roll	1	52	Canada; China	2019–present	Family Jr.	CGI
Ricky Zoom	2	52	France; Pakistan; United Kingdom; China; Italy	2019–21	Gulli; RAI; Youku Kids	CGI
The Rocketeer	1	22	United States	2019–20	Disney Junior	CGI
Roger	1	78	France	2019	France 4	CGI
Roys Bedoys	5	250	United States	2019–present	YouTube	Flash
The Rubbish World of Dave Spud	3	104	United Kingdom	2019–24	CITV (seasons 1–3); ITVX (season 3)	Flash
S.O.S Pets	1	24	Russia	2019	YouTube	Flash
Sadie Sparks	1	52	Ireland; France	2019	Disney Channel	CGI
Saga's Stories	2	20	Sweden	2019–20	Viaplay	
Scooby-Doo and Guess Who?	2	52	United States	2019–21	Cartoon Network (2019–21); Boomerang (2019); HBO Max (2021)	Traditional
Scribbles and Ink	2	7	United States	2019–21	PBS Kids	Flash
Seis Manos	1	8	United States	2019	Netflix	Traditional
Shapes School		11	United States	2019	BabyFirst	CGI
Sherwood	1	10	United States; Ireland; New Zealand	2019	YouTube Premium	CGI
Shuke and Beita	4	104	China	2019–present	Tencent Video	CGI
Sir Mouse	1	26	Belgium; Germany; Ireland	2019	RTÉjr	
Snoopy in Space	2	24	Canada; United States	2019–21	Apple TV+	Flash
Spin Fighters	1	30	China	2019		CGI
Spirit Sword Sovereign	5	305	China	2019–present	Tencent Video	CGI
Spongo, Fuzz and Jalapeña	1	26	Australia	2019	ABC Me	Flash
Squish	1	52	France; Spain	2019–20	Gulli; Canal J	Flash
Star Wars Roll Out	1	16	United States	2019–20	YouTube	
Steven Universe Future	1	20	United States	2019–20	Cartoon Network	Traditional
Stonyz	1	13	South Korea	2019–20	KBS1	CGI
The Strange Chores	3	78	Australia	2019–24	ABC Me (series 1–2); ABC Family (series 3)	Toon Boom Harmony
Sugar and Toys	2	16	United States	2019–20	Fuse	Flash/Live action
Super V	1	12	India	2019–20	Disney Channel; Marvel HQ; Star Sports; StarPlus; Hotstar	CGI
Synostone	2	52	South Korea	2019–20	KBS1; KBS2	CGI
T.O.T.S.	3	75	United States	2019–22	Disney Junior	CGI
Tales of Nai Nai	2	20	New Zealand	2019	HeiHei	Flash
The Tales of Wonder Keepers	1	26	Russia	2019–21	O!	CGI
Talking Tom Heroes	1	52	Slovenia; South Korea	2019–21	YouTube	Flash
Team DroniX	1	26	France	2019–20	France 4	CGI
Teenie Scouts Big Five	2	52	South Korea	2019–21	KBS2; KBS1	Stop motion
Tot Cop	1	10	Ireland; United States	2019	Nick Jr. Too	Flash
Trailer Park Boys: The Animated Series	2	20	Canada	2019–20	Netflix	Flash
Triviatopia	1	20	Argentina	2019	YouTube	
Tuca & Bertie	3	30	United States	2019–22	Netflix (season 1); Adult Swim (seasons 2–3)	Flash
Tuiga	1	13	Brazil	2019	ZooMoo	Flash
Turbozaurs	4	104	Russia	2019–present	O!	CGI
Turma da Mônica Jovem	1	26	Brazil	2019–21	Cartoon Network	
Twelve Forever	1	25	United States	2019	Netflix	Traditional
Undone	2	16	United States	2019–22	Amazon Prime Video	Traditional
Urban Tails	1	26	Ireland	2019	RTÉjr	Flash
La Vaca Lola: La Serie	1	3	Colombia	2019–present	YouTube	Traditional/Flash
The VeggieTales Show	1	26	United States	2019–22	Trinity Broadcasting Network	CGI
Vertical World	1	12	China	2019	Bilibili	
Victor and Valentino	3	119	United States	2019–22	Cartoon Network	Traditional
Virtual Guardians	1	26	South Korea	2019–20	KBS1	CGI
WeeBoom	1	26	Brazil	2019–20	Boomerang	Flash
When I Woke Up I Became a Bagel Girl	1	15	South Korea	2019	B TV; U+ TV; Olleh TV; Laftel	
Where's Waldo?	2	40	United States	2019–21	Universal Kids (season 1); Peacock (season 2)	Flash
Wings of the World	1	16	China	2019–20	Bilibili	CGI
Xavier Riddle and the Secret Museum	2	61	Canada; United States	2019–26	PBS Kids	Flash
YooHoo to the Rescue	3	52	South Korea; Italy	2019–20	Frisbee	CGI
You're Not a Monster	1	10	United States	2019	IMDb TV	Flash

== See also ==
- 2019 in animation
- 2019 in anime
- List of animated feature films of 2019
