= Cat burglar (disambiguation) =

A cat burglar is a person who uses agility to enter a premises illegally.

Cat Burglar or similar may also refer to:

== Film ==
- The Cat Burglar, a 1961 American neo-noir crime film
- Cat Burglar, a 2022 British-American animated interactive film
- The Cat Burglars, an unreleased British film by Aardman Animations

== Literature ==
- "The Cat Burglar", a 1926 short story by H. C. Bailey
- "The Cat-Burglar", a 1929 short story by Edgar Wallace
- Shifty McGifty and Slippery Sam - The Cat Burglar, a 2015 picture book illustrated by Tracey Corderoy

== Music ==
- "Cat Burglar", from He Named Me Malala (soundtrack)
- "Cat Burglar", from the soundtrack of the Doctor Who 2008–2010 specials

== People and fictional characters ==
- Cat Burglar, the 2001 and 2002 title-holder of the MEWF Heavyweight Championship
- Cat Burglar (SuperKitties)
- Nami (One Piece), also known as Cat Burglar Nami

== Television ==
- "The Cat Burglar", a 1963 episode of The Dick Van Dyke Show
- "The Cat Burglar", a 1964 episode of The Jack Benny Program
- "The Cat Burglar", a 1966 episode of The Beverly Hillbillies
- "The Cat Burglars", a 1970 episode of My Three Sons
- "Cat Burglars", a 1972 episode of The Flintstone Comedy Hour
- "The Cat Burglars", a 1973 episode of Inch High, Private Eye
- "The Cat Burglar", a 1979 episode of Casper and the Angels
- "Cat Burglar", a 1996 episode of Billy the Cat
- "The Cat Burglar", a 1981 episode of Love, Sidney
- "Cat Burglar", a 2000 episode of Meeow!
- "The Cat Burglar", a 2001 episode of Fetch the Vet
- "The Cat Burglar", a 2001 episode of Grizzly Tales for Gruesome Kids
- "Cat Burglar", a 2002 episode of Bram & Alice
- "The Cat Burglar", a 2011 episode of Paradise Café
- "Cat Burglar", a 2014 episode of Get Ace
- "Cat Burglar', a 2020 episode of Boy Girl Dog Cat Mouse Cheese

== See also ==
- Poacher
- Animal trafficking
- Burglar (disambiguation)
- Cat (disambiguation)
