= Bridge of Spies (soundtrack) =

Bridge of Spies (Original Motion Picture Soundtrack)

Film score by Thomas Newman
- Released: October 16, 2015
- Studios: Newman Scoring Stage, 20th Century Fox Studios, Los Angeles; Deep Sleep Studios, Miami
- Genre: Film score
- Length: 48:25
- Label: Hollywood
- Producers: Thomas Newman; Bill Bernstein

Thomas Newman chronology
He Named Me Malala (2015)	Bridge of Spies (2015)	Spectre (2015)

Bridge of Spies (Original Motion Picture Soundtrack) is the soundtrack to the Steven Spielberg-directed historical drama film Bridge of Spies, released by Hollywood Records, alongside the film on October 16, 2015. It is the second Spielberg film not to be scored by John Williams after The Color Purple (1985). The film was composed and conducted by Thomas Newman, who replaced Williams in March 2015, due to health complications. The score was critically acclaimed and received nominations for Academy Award for Best Original Score and BAFTA Award for Best Film Music in 2016.

== Background ==
In March 2015, Spielberg's regular collaborator John Williams was set to compose the score for the film. However, Williams exited from the project two weeks later, citing health issues, and was replaced by Thomas Newman; John Williams would however score for The BFG.

While Newman worked with several directors in his two-decade long career, he felt working with Spielberg was a "little intimidating" and further said "You sit with him in a room, and you're playing something — a piece of music. And you trust how he responds. And so I would just try to get those feelings that evoked that in him. His instincts are pretty unerring. It was very clear, but it was never doctrinaire, it was never dogmatic at all. I think he was very interested in getting into the creative heart of anyone he collaborates with."

The score consisted of piano cues layered with string motifs, implementing many of his previous scores, but also met Spielberg's aesthetic on its own terms, favoring "big, unembarrassed emotions and moments of uncynical beauty".

== Critical reception ==
James Southall of Movie Wave wrote "Bridge of Spies is the third of Newman's four scores this year. It's a diverse bunch – a gentle comedy, a moving documentary, a political thriller and a Bond movie. They're all very good but for my money this is the pick of them. It's got real life to it and, while Newman employs a number of familiar techniques, he manages to keep everything sounding fresh and always engaging. It's already been announced that John Williams will return for Spielberg's next movie, The BFG, but when the time does eventually come to choose his successor, the director need look no further." Jonathan Broxton of Movie Music UK stated "Thankfully, Newman did not try to write a John Williams score for this film – it would have served no-one if Newman failed at being Williams, while simultaneously failing at being himself. It bears all his personal idiosyncratic compositional hallmarks, many of which will be over-familiar to some listeners, and as such may elicit accusations of Newman writing the same old score again." and concluded "Whether Thomas Newman will go on to be Steven Spielberg's regular collaborator in the future is unclear, but if Bridge of Spies tells us one thing, it's that the legacy of John Williams will be in good hands if he does."

Mfiles.com wrote "In an era of so much mass-produced, homogenous film music, it's a bracing joy to know that unique talents like Thomas Newman are being utilized on superb films like Bridge of Spies. He's a rare composer with a truly, almost defiantly singular voice, a keen dramatist who carefully builds a sense of mood across each of his soundtracks before richly rewarding the listeners in the home stretch." Filmtracks.com wrote "Depending on your mood for this type of introspective thriller music with a wholesome bent, Bridge of Spies could be a three-star or four-star effort, though given its smart match for the film, the latter rating is fairer for the patient listener."

The Guardian's Mark Kermode called Newman's score as "surprisingly understated". Anthony Lane of The New Yorker opined "while Spielberg has shifted in his choice of composer, from John Williams to Thomas Newman, the shift is not far enough. He should have taken his cue from Otto Preminger, who leavened Anatomy of a Murder his courtroom masterwork of 1959, with the music of Duke Ellington. We even saw the Duke onscreen, playing piano with Jimmy Stewart. The lilt and the kick of the soundtrack didn't compromise that movie. They gave it cool."

== Accolades ==
Award	Date of ceremony	Category	Recipient(s)	Result	Ref.
Academy Awards	February 28, 2016	Best Original Score	Thomas Newman	Nominated	
British Academy Film Awards	February 14, 2016	Best Film Music	Thomas Newman	Nominated	

== Track listing ==
All music is composed by Thomas Newman.

No.	Title	Length
1.	"Hall of Trade Unions, Moscow"	0:43
2.	"Sunlit Silence"	4:04
3.	"Ejection Protocol"	1:56
4.	"Standing Man"	2:11
5.	"Rain"	1:21
6.	"Lt. Francis Gary Powers"	3:04
7.	"The Article"	1:36
8.	"The Wall"	2:14
9.	"Private Citizen"	1:35
10.	"The Impatient Plan"	1:35
11.	"West Berlin"	1:12
12.	"Friedrichstrasse Station"	1:20
13.	"Glienicke Bridge"	10:51
14.	"Homecoming"	7:46
15.	"Bridge of Spies (End Title)"	6:57
Total length:		48:25

== Personnel ==
Credits adapted from CD liner notes

- Composer – Thomas Newman
- Music producer – Bill Bernstein, Thomas Newman
- Recording – Shinnosuke Miyazawa, Larry Mah, Armin Steiner, Tommy Vicari
- Editing – Bill Bernstein, Jordan Corngold, Michael Zainer
- Mixing – Tommy Vicari
- Mastering – Bernie Grundman
- Music contractor – Leslie Morris
- Music co-ordinator – George Doering, Shinnosuke Miyazawa
- Copyist – Reprise Music Services
- Executive in charge of music – Mitchell Leib

Instruments

- Bass – Christian Kollgaard, David Parmeter, Domenic Genova, Geoffrey Osika, Jeff Bandy, Oscar Hidalgo, Stephen Dress, Thomas Harte, Timothy Eckert, Bruce Morgenthaler, Nico Abondolo
- Bassoon – Judy Farmer, Kenneth Munday, Will May, Rose Corrigan
- Cello – Carolyn Litchfield, Christina Soule, Dane Little, Erika Duke-Kirkpatrick, Kim Scholes, Giovanna Clayton, Melissa Hasin, Steve Richards, Suzie Katayama, Timothy Landauer, Trevor Handy, Vahe Hayrikyan, Xiao-Dan Zheng, Dennis Karmazyn, Stephen Erdody
- Clarinet – Ralph William, Gary Bovyer
- Flute – Diane Alancraig, Steve Kujala
- French Horn – Alan Fogle, Dan Kelley, Dylan Hart, Jenny Kim, Joseph Meyer, John Reynolds, Justin Hageman, Kristy Morrell, Phillip Yao, Mark Adams, Steve Becknell
- Harp – Gayle Levant
- Oboe – Joseph Stone, Lara Wickes, Leslie Reed
- Percussion – Daniel Greco
- Trombone – William Reichenbach, Charles Loper, William Booth
- Trumpet – Malcolm McNab, Wayne Bergeron
- Tuba – Jim Self
- Viola – Aaron Oltman, Alma Fernandez, Carolyn Riley, Darrin McCann, Dmitri Bovaird, Jennie Hansen, John Hayhurst, Karie Prescott, Kate Reddish, Keith Greene, Marlow Fisher, Matt Funes, Meredith Crawford, Robert Berg, Robert Brophy, Scott Hosfeld, Shawn Mann, Thomas Diener, David Walther, Victoria Miskolczy
- Violin – Amy Hershberger, Ana Landauer, Charles Bisharat, Darius Campo, Elizabeth Hedman, Eun Mee Ahn, Gil Romero, Gina Kronstadt, Grace Oh, Haim Shtrum, Jay Rosen, Jennifer Levin, Jennifer Munday, Joel Derouin, Hohn Wittenberg, Josefina Vergara, Julie Rogers, Kathleen Robertson, Kenneth Yerke, Kevin Connolly, Liane Mautner, Lily Chen, Lily Ho, Lisa Dondlinger, Maia Jasper, Marina Manukian, Mark Robertson, Mike Markman, Natalie Leggett, Nina Evtuhov, Norman Hughes, Peter Kent, Phil Levy, Rebecca Bunnell, Richard Altenbach, Robert Matsuda, Roberto Cani, Roger Wilkie, Ron Clark, Sara Parkins, Sarah Thornblade, Serena McKinney, Sharon Jackson, Tamara Hatwan, Tiffany Hu, Yelena Yegoryan, Yutong Sharp

Orchestra

- Orchestration – J.A.C. Redford
- Conductor – Thomas Newman
- Choir contractor – Sally Stevens
- Concertmaster – Sid Page
- Soloist – Dan Greco, George Doering, Rick Cox, Steve Tavaglione, Thomas Newman
