= The Legend of Zeta & Ozz =

Chilean animated television series

- La Leyenda de Zeta y Ozz (Spanish)
- Created by: Jorge Orellana and Juan Pablo Álvarez
- Written by: Bambú Orellana
- Country of origin: Chile
- Original language: Spanish
- No. of seasons: 1
- No. of episodes: 20

Production
- Producer: Pato Escala
- Running time: 3 minutes (first segments); 15 seconds (second segments)
- Production companies: Niño Viejo; Punk Robot; Typpo; Cartoon Network LA Original Production

Original release
- Network: Cartoon Network
- Release: February 18, 2019

The Legend of Zeta & Ozz (Spanish: La Leyenda de Zeta y Ozz) is a Chilean animated short series created by Jorge Orellana and Juan Pablo Álvarez, with the chilean studios: Nino Viejo, Typpo, Punk Robot and Cartoon Network LA Original Production. It premiered on February 18, 2019, on Cartoon Network in Latin America.

It was created as a concept in 2017 and exhibited the following year at the Chilemonos animation festival, and was ultimately broadcast in a partnership with Cartoon Network. It was awarded best pitch at the Annecy International Animation Film Festival.

== Premise ==
Zeta and Ozz are best friends, who share a competitive spirit.

== Characters and original voice cast ==
- Zeta (voiced by Carlo Vázquez): He is an orange fox with a grumpy and selfish personality. He also likes to compete against everyone and insult those he considers losers.
- Ozz (voiced by Luis Fernando Orozco): He is a yellow bear with a childish personality.
