= The Second Best Exotic Marigold Hotel (soundtrack) =

The Second Best Exotic Marigold Hotel (Original Motion Picture Soundtrack)

Soundtrack album by Thomas Newman and various artists
- Released: 16 February 2015
- Recorded: 2014–2015
- Studios: Abbey Road Studios, London
- Genres: Film soundtrack; film score
- Length: 61:11
- Label: Sony Classical
- Producers: Thomas Newman; Bill Bernstein

Thomas Newman chronology
The Judge (2014)	The Second Best Exotic Marigold Hotel (2015)	He Named Me Malala (2015)

The Second Best Exotic Marigold Hotel (Original Motion Picture Soundtrack) is the soundtrack album to the 2015 film The Second Best Exotic Marigold Hotel directed by John Madden, which is the sequel to The Best Exotic Marigold Hotel (2011). The soundtrack features original score composed by Thomas Newman and songs from popular Bollywood films. It was released through Sony Classical Records on 16 February 2015.

== Background ==
Thomas Newman who composed the score for The Best Exotic Marigold Hotel returned for the sequel. He also worked with John Madden in this film and The Debt (2011). Like the first film, the musical score accompanied Indian players and vocal soloists to bring a "musical and cultural synthesis" which was "atmospheric, surprising, thrilling, funny, haunting and entirely sui generis", according to Madden. The film's soundtrack was announced on 28 January 2015 and was released in the United Kingdom on 16 February and in United States on 3 March.

== Reception ==
James Southall of Movie Wave wrote "The Second Best Exotic Marigold Hotel is every bit as good as the first one was and it's great to hear this wonderful composer excel once again, showing that just because it's lighter fare it doesn't mean it can't be very satisfying. It's music that's just full of sparkling life and it's wonderful." AllMusic wrote "At times moving, whimsical, or celebratory, Thomas Newman's score for the second in the Marigold Hotel film series mixes Eastern and Western influences, blending Indian scales, rhythms, and instruments with a Western orchestra—to varying degrees".

Richard Lawson of Vanity Fair wrote "Thomas Newman's dreamy score wraps us in its shimmery pashmina". Peter Debruge of Variety wrote "Thomas Newman's score works, elbowing its way in to boost the energy at any moment we might want to catch our breath, while also supporting two full-blown Bollywood-style dance numbers." Adam Lubitow of City called it an "effective score from Thomas Newman, add to the polished feel." A reviewer based at The Copenhagen Post wrote "Thomas Newman's score is surprisingly rich and understated".

== Track listing ==
All tracks are written by Thomas Newman, except where noted.

No.	Title	Lyrics	Music	Artist(s)	Length
1.	"Discretion"				0:38
2.	"Second Best Exotic"				3:05
3.	"Knees Then Names"				1:56
4.	"Chai"				1:28
5.	"Catnip"				1:49
6.	"Ye Ishq Hai" (from Jab We Met)	Irshad Kamil	Pritam	Shreya Ghoshal	3:55
7.	"Busy Pensioner Bee"				1:14
8.	"Nimish & Abhilash"				1:27
9.	"Roll Call"				1:24
10.	"Already Gone"				1:16
11.	"Soft Hiss of Treachery"				1:12
12.	"Completely Lethal"				1:40
13.	"Balma" (from Khiladi 786)	Sameer Anjaan	Himesh Reshammiya	Shreya Ghoshal, Shriram Iyer	3:48
14.	"The Fun Never Starts"				1:39
15.	"Sagai"				1:27
16.	"Mumbai"				2:16
17.	"Unreasonable Behavior"				2:01
18.	"The Brilliant bits"				2:43
19.	"Aaina"				1:00
20.	"Bringer of New Things"				0:34
21.	"Aila Re Aila" (from Khatta Meetha)	Nitin Raikwar	Pritam	Daler Mehndi, Kalpana Patowary	3:14
22.	"Scorpions"				2:00
23.	"Shaadi"				1:26
24.	"Reservoirs of Affection"				1:23
25.	"Wedding"				4:21
26.	"Jhoom Barabar Jhoom" (from Jhoom Barabar Jhoom)	Gulzar	Shankar–Ehsaan–Loy	KK; Mahalakshmi Iyer; Shankar Mahadevan; Sukhwinder Singh	3:36
27.	"Life Piled on Life"				1:06
28.	"Map of the World (End Title)"				4:42
Total length:					61:11

== Personnel ==
Credits adapted from liner notes:

- Music composed and conducted by – Thomas Newman
- Producer – Bill Bernstein, Thomas Newman
- Soloists – George Doering, Jagannathan Ramamoorthy, John Beasley, Steve Tavaglione
- Vocals – Hariharan, Suchismita
- Orchestrators – J. A. C. Redford, Simon Rhodes
- Contractor – Isobel Griffiths, Leslie Morris
- Engineer – Gordon Davidson
- Recording – Simon Rhodes, Larry Mah, Shinnosuke Miyazawa
- Mixing – Simon Rhodes
- Mastering – Dave Collins
- Score editor – Bill Bernstein, James Bellamy, Tony Lewis
- Coordinator – George Doering
- Music supervisor – Rebecca Morellato
- Liner notes – John Madden
- Booklet editor and design – WLP Ltd.

== Accolades ==
Newman's score was shortlisted as one among the 112 original scores to be considered for the 88th Academy Awards but was not nominated.

Award	Category	Recipient(s) and nominee(s)	Result	Ref.
International Film Music Critics Association	Best Original Score for a Comedy Film	Thomas Newman	Nominated	
