= Burglar (disambiguation) =

A burglar is a person who engages in burglary.

Burglar may also refer to:

== Film ==
- The Burglar (1917 film), an American silent drama film
- The Burglar (1928 film), an American comedy film with Ruth Hiatt
- Burglars (film), a 1930 German musical comedy film
- The Burglar (1957 film), a 1957 American crime/thriller film
- The Burglars, a 1971 French film
- The Burglar (1972 film), a Dutch film
- Burglar (film), a 1987 American comedy film

== Other uses ==
- Burglar (album), a 1974 album by Freddie King
- Burglar (comics), a fictional character in Marvel Comics

== See also ==
- Cat burglar (disambiguation)
