= Bugsbot Ignition =

South Korean animated television series

- Promotional poster
- Genre: Adventure; Fantasy
- Voices of: Kim Chae-ha; Kim Yul; Kim Ga-Ryung; Yu Yeong; Kang Seong-woo
- Country of origin: South Korea
- Original language: Korean
- No. of episodes: 26

Production
- Running time: 22-24 minutes
- Production companies: Cocktail Media; Studio BAZOOKA

Original release
- Network: Tooniverse
- Release: July 9, 2019 – January 6, 2020

Bugsbot Ignition (Korean: 벅스봇 이그니션; RR: Beokseubot igeunisyeon) is a South Korean animated television series. The series is produced by Cocktail Media and Studio Bazooka. The series includes the same team production from The Haunted House series. It aired on cable network Tooniverse from July 9, 2019, to January 6, 2020.

The series was streamed online on YouTube.

== Characters and casts ==
- Gang Maru (강마루; Kim Chae-ha)
- Han Garam (한가람; Kim Yul)
- Go Ara (고아라; Kim Ga-Ryung)
- Shin Bora (신보라; Yu Yeong)
- Noa (노아; Kang Seong-woo)
- Kai (카이; Kang Ho-chul)
- Zion (시온; Shin Yong-woo)
- Purqir (푸르키르; Lee Ho-san)
- Shadow (쉐도우; Choi Seung-hoon)
- Ha Eun (하은; Kang Sae-bom)

== Production and release ==
In May 2019, CJ ENM's Tooniverse announced that the show would be released in July 2019.

On June 14, 2019, the release date was revealed; it premiered on Tooniverse on July 9, 2019.

== Episodes ==
No.	Title	Original release date
1	"Into the Forest of Another World" (Korean: 다른 세계의 숲으로)	July 9, 2019
2	"In the Flames" (Korean: 불꽃 속에서)	July 9, 2019
3	"Protect the Longicorn Beetle Village!" (Korean: 장수풍뎅이족 마을을 지켜라!)	July 16, 2019
4	"Garam's Buddy?!" (Korean: 가람이의 버디?!)	July 23, 2019
5	"Garam Betrayed?!" (Korean: 가람이가 배신을?!)	July 30, 2019
6	"The Legendary Saint Echora" (Korean: 전설의 에코라 성녀)	August 6, 2019
7	"Bugsbot Appears at School!" (Korean: 학교에 나타난 벅스봇!)	August 12, 2019
8	"The Secret of the Black Forest and Purple" (Korean: 검은 숲과 보라의 비밀)	August 19, 2019
9	"Hercules is Angry!" (Korean: 분노하는 헤라클레스!)	August 26, 2019
10	"Sister Bora in Danger" (Korean: 위험에 빠진 보라 누나)	September 3, 2019
11	"A New Four Heavenly Kings Appear!" (Korean: 새로운 사천왕 등장!)	September 9, 2019
12	"Uninvited Guests?!" (Korean: 초대 받지않는 손님?!)	September 16, 2019
13	"Garam is Mine!" (Korean: 가람이는 내 꺼야!)	September 23, 2019
14	"Transfer Student Gong Sam-sik!" (Korean: 전학생 공삼식!)	October 14, 2019
15	"New Enemy Sumatra!" (Korean: 새로운 적 수마트라!)	October 21, 2019
16	"Find New Strength!" (Korean: 새로운 힘을 찾아서!)	October 28, 2019
17	"Carlos is Weird!" (Korean: 카로스가 이상해!)	November 4, 2019
18	"Stop Carlos!" (Korean: 카로스를 막아라!)	November 11, 2019
19	"Fusion Coin Showdown!" (Korean: 퓨전 코인 대결!)	November 18, 2019
20	"Protect Carlos!" (Korean: 카로스를 지켜라!)	November 25, 2019
21	"Shadow and Noah" (Korean: 섀도우와 노아)	December 2, 2019
22	"Ha-eun's Secret!" (Korean: 하은이의 비밀!)	December 9, 2019
23	"Kai's Sincerity" (Korean: 카이의 진심)	December 16, 2019
24	"A Confrontation That Cannot Be Backed Down From" (Korean: 물러설 수 없는 대결)	December 23, 2019
25	"Stop Zion!" (Korean: 시온을 막아라!)	December 30, 2019
26	"Gather Everyone's Hearts!" (Korean: 모두의 마음을 모아!)	January 6, 2020

== Spin-off sequels ==
It was announced that the short spin-off sequel titled Bugsbot G (Korean: 벅스봇; RR: BeokseubotG) would be released on September 19, 2020 on Tooniverse, totaling 15 episodes of 4 minutes.

== Reception ==
By September 9, 2019, the series had been ranked 1.046% average viewers, according to Nielsen Korea.
