= He Named Me Malala (soundtrack) =

He Named Me Malala (Original Motion Picture Soundtrack)

Film score by Thomas Newman
- Released: October 2, 2015 (digital); October 30, 2015 (physical)
- Genre: Film score
- Length: 53:20
- Label: Sony Classical
- Producers: Thomas Newman; Bill Bernstein

Thomas Newman chronology
The Second Best Exotic Marigold Hotel (2015)	He Named Me Malala (2015)	Bridge of Spies (2015)

He Named Me Malala (Original Motion Picture Soundtrack) is the soundtrack to the 2015 documentary film of the same name about young Pakistani female activist and Nobel Peace Prize laureate Malala Yousafzai. The album was released digitally on October 2, 2015, and through physical formats on October 30 by Sony Classical. It consisted the film's original score composed by Thomas Newman, while also featured two original songs that are not included in the album.

== Development ==
The original score is composed by American film composer and conductor Thomas Newman. Newman met Yousafzai at his studio for a day, with her father Ziauddin Yousafzai which he called it as "quite an honor". He was moved by the storytelling and felt that "the music could be part of what moved me, that I was trying to contribute to something that was meaningful outside the realm of creative work but just more in terms of the world."

The film features the traditional song "Happiness" performed by Form IV Class of Kisaruni Secondary School in 2014. Alicia Keys co-wrote two original songs with Newman — "I Am Many" and "Story to Tell". Those songs were not officially featured in the film's soundtrack and has not been publicly released.

== Track listing ==
No.	Title	Length
1.	"A Pashtun Story"	2:16
2.	"I Am Malala"	2:24
3.	"Which Camera Now?"	1:11
4.	"July 12"	2:01
5.	"Ideology"	1:56
6.	"Headmaster"	2:04
7.	"Old Life New Life"	1:58
8.	"Bonfires"	1:28
9.	"Cat Burglar"	1:20
10.	"School v. Celebrity"	1:44
11.	"Courtship"	1:16
12.	"Birmingham"	2:20
13.	"Radio Mullah"	2:29
14.	"A Fiery Speaker"	2:41
15.	"Night"	1:25
16.	"Candies for Books"	1:39
17.	"No More There"	3:23
18.	"Peace Prize"	1:04
19.	"Refugees"	4:34
20.	"The Women"	0:55
21.	"Risk"	1:22
22.	"Speak What Is in Your Soul"	2:28
23.	"Grievous Injury"	4:54
24.	"66 Million Girls"	2:11
25.	"The Same Malala"	0:45
26.	"Who Really I Am"	1:21
Total length:		53:20

== Reception ==
James Southall of Movie Wave wrote "Thomas Newman is the greatest living film composer and He Named Me Malala is absolutely prime territory for him. True, there is not much here that strays far from ground he has explored before, but hearing him just do his thing is always a delight and this is such a good album, full of so many little textures and depths that are fascinating to explore. He has numerous imitators but nobody has ever managed to make this style of music work the way he does so often – his usual band of soloists provide such wonderful colour, the recording (as ever) perfectly balanced to show them off. This is vintage Newman and undoubtedly one of the scores of the year." Music to Write to stated "The score for He Named Me Malala is an incredibly satisfying merging of Newman's colorful orchestration, unusual instrumentation, ethnic instruments, and memorable melodies. It mixes electronic sound with acoustic performances and what it does for the writer is solidify the place in your brain you want to keep focused while you write. Due to the content of the film, there is a degree of innocence and strength in the music which transitions to Malala's story of triumph. This album is a heart-warming one to listen to."

Justin Chang of Variety wrote "Thomas Newman's emotional cattle prod of a score, still, as musical overkill goes, it's preferable to the goopy Alicia Keys ballad that drowns out the closing credits." Rebecca Keegan of Los Angeles Times wrote "A stirring score by composer Thomas Newman underpins the drama."

Mark Kermode of The Guardian called Thomas Newman's score as "lush" though dismissed its importance in the film's story, that "pluck at your heartstrings and inspire your devotion". Kenji Fujishima of Slant Magazine also gave a contrasting review, saying "Thomas Newman's soupy score doesn't help matters either, as his sweeping orchestral style suffocates in its attempts at uplift." A reviewer from Hindustan Times called the score as "bit over-empathetic". Sophie Kaufman of Little White Lies mentioned: "Thomas Newman's gently heartbroken score is used to exaggerate the hand-wringing emotionality of the world's ills. Someone as unique as Malala would have been more aptly served by more distinctive music, not to mention a film less defined by playing it safe."'

== Accolades ==
The score was selected as one of the 112 contenders for the Best Original Score category for the 88th Academy Awards, but could not get selected. It received a nomination for International Film Music Critics Association Award for Best Original Score for a Documentary.

== Personnel ==
Credits adapted from CD liner notes.

- Music – Thomas Newman
- Producer – Bill Bernstein, Thomas Newman
- Recording – Shinnosuke Miyazawa
- Mixing – Tommy Vicari
- Mastering – Bernie Grundman
- Music editor – Bill Bernstein
- Music Supervisor – John Houlihan
- Design – WLP Ltd.

Instruments

- Bass – Bruce Morgenthaler, Christian Kollgaard, Edward Meares, Jeff Bandy, Michael Valerio, Steve Dress, Thomas Harte, Timothy Eckert
- Cello – Barry Gold, Carolyn Litchfield, Christina Soule, Dennis Karmazyn, Erika Duke-Kirkpatrick, John Acosta, Matt Cooker, Melissa Hasin, Paula Hochhalter, Tim Landauer, Vahe Hayrikyan, Xiaodan Zheng
- Soloist – George Doering, John Beasley, Steve Tavaglione, Thomas Newman
- Viola – Aaron Oltman, Carolyn Riley, Cassandra Richburg, David Walther, Erik Rynearson, Jennie Hansen, John Hayhurst, Kate Reddish, Keith Greene, Marlow Fisher, Matthew Funes, Meredith Crawford, Robert Berg, Thomas Diener, Victoria Miskolczy
- Violin – Amy Hershberger, Armen Movsessian, Ashoka Thiagarajan, Carol Pool, Carolyn Riley, Cheryl Brick Norman, Christine Frank, Darius Campo, Dimitrie Leivici, Elizabeth Hedman, Gina Konstadt, Jackie Brand, Jay Rosen, Jennifer Levin, Jennifer Munday, Jessica Guideri, Julie Rogers, Kathleen Robertson, Kevin Connelly, Liane Mautner, Lisa Donlinger, Maia Jasper, Marina Manukian, Mario DeLeon, Michael Markman, Nina Evtuhov, Peter Kent, Phillip Levy, Robert Matsuda, Sam Fischer*, Sara Parkins, Sarah Thornblade, Sharon Jackson, Tamara Hatwan, Tiffany Hu, Yutong Sharp

Orchestra

- Conductor – Thomas Newman
- Contractor – Leslie Morris
- Orchestration – J.A.C. Redford
- Concertmaster – Sid Page
- Recording – Tommy Vicari
