= WeeBoom =

- Original title card
- Genre: Comedy; Adventure
- Created by: Jonas Brandão
- Directed by: Jonas Brandão; Bruno Gondim Luna (art); Ruben Feffer & Gustavo Xurlat (music)
- Voices of: Jussara Marques; Italo Luiz; Pier Marchi
- Music by: Ruben Feffer; Gustavo Kurlat
- Opening theme: WeeBoom, performer by Pier Marchi, Italo Luiz & Jussara Marques
- Country of origin: Brazil
- Original language: Portuguese
- No. of seasons: 2
- No. of episodes: 52

Production
- Executive producers: Cid Makino; Guille Hiertz
- Producer: Marô Blanques
- Running time: 7 minutes
- Production companies: Agência Nacional do Cinema; Split Studio; Turner Broadcasting System Latin America

Original release
- Network: Boomerang
- Release: July 5, 2019 – present

WeeBoom is a Brazilian animated series created and directed by Jonas Brandão and produced by Split Studio by Ancine, and aired by Boomerang Brazil from July 5, 2019 to Future. The series shows an adventurous rabbit named Wee, who was traveling on an unknown mountain, accidentally hit the green circle and came out several flying creatures called Boomies, and with the help of the Boomies' guardian, Boom, they cross the entire world to capture the boomies.

The series began airing on Canal Futura on January 3, 2020 and stopped airing on August 10, 2023.

== Characters ==
- Wee (voiced by Jussara Marques) is a very smart and courageous adventurous green rabbit.
- Boomies (voiced by Pier Marchi) are magical little creatures that live inside Boom's stomach. When they hear a song from each place, they go "crazy" and bring chaos to the cities where they are found.
- Boom (voiced by Ítalo Luiz) is a yellow monster that can become giant, among several other of its special powers.

== Episodes ==
Episode	Title	Description	Written by	Air date
1	Mamma Mia	Wee and Boom look for a Boomie in the city of Palermo, Italy, famous for its tarantella and pasta. Hungry, Wee and Boom stumble upon a cafeteria whose boss seems to be crazy, turning the place and customers upside down.	Jonas Brandão & Roger Keesse	July 5, 2019
2	Ah, L' Amour...	Wee and Boom look for a Boomie in Paris, whose inhabitants seem to be more in love than usual.	Jonas Brandão & Roger Keesse	July 5, 2019
3	Bravos Guerreiros	Edinburgh, the city of the brave Scottish warriors, holds a mystery. The inhabitants seem to be missing. Behold, Wee and Boom discover that they are hiding in their homes.	Jonas Brandão	July 12, 2019
4	O Castelo de Brahms	Transylvania, Romania, is home to the famous castle of Count Dracula. Behold, Wee and Boom come across a Boomie refugee in the castle, about to turn people into vampires.	Tereza Temer	July 19, 2019
5	Ay Ay Ay!	Wee and Boom are in Guadalajara, the capital of the Mexican arts, where the famous soap opera "Ilusiones del Amor" is filmed, starring none other than the famous Mexican actress Dulce Maria Silvana.	Tereza Temer	July 26, 2019
6	Boa Sorte, Boom	Dublin, Ireland, is famous for its beautiful parks and... for the sudden luck of its inhabitants. Wee, who doesn't believe in luck, appears to be on a terrible run of bad luck while Boom is having a surprisingly lucky day.	Tereza Temer	August 2, 2019
7	Hit do Verão	The favelas of Rio de Janeiro, Brazil, keep a very unconfidential secret: people are becoming famous for whatever they do on the internet.	Ingrid Schmidt	August 9, 2019
8	Iodeleeei!!!!	Wee and Boom are enjoying the Alps with their Tyrolean and merry sheep. But something is wrong. Wee is being shot by snowballs from the distant mountains.	Rafael Baliú	August 16, 2019
9	Wee Beat Boom Box	New York, the city that never sleeps, seems to be under attack from Boomie. After all, all people are behaving like real rappers.	Rafael Baliu	August 23, 2019
10	Howdy, Cowboys!	Wee and Boom are based in Houston, United States, which despite its modern-day features, some of its inhabitants seem to be acting like they're in the wild west.	Jonas Brandão	August 30, 2019
11	Profissão Cupido	In a village in Mozambique, young Berum uses the powers of a Boomie to master a species of xylophone known as a timbila to win the heart of his beloved, Muaba. When Wee and Boom capture Boomie, Berum despairs. But the pair of friends show him that they are much more than Boomie catchers: they are true love advisors.	Rafael Baliú	September 6, 2019
12	Nihao, Boomie	Wee and Boom are in the forbidden city in Beijing for Chinese New Year. And it's the year of the rabbit, or rather the year of the Wee. However, people all seem to be acting as if they were in China of old.	Ingrid Schmidt	September 13, 2019
13	O Início	Upon capturing a Boomie, Wee and Boom find themselves trapped at the bottom of a cave that has caved in. The only chance they can get out of there is to escape through a hole in the ceiling, throwing a rope with a knot.	Ingrid Schmidt	September 20, 2019
14	Ibiza Fitness	Wee and Boom are on vacation in Ibiza, Spain's beautiful seaside town. His vacation, however, is short-lived, as Wee is challenged by the muscular Diego to Ibiza Fitness, a reality show for marombeiros. Wee and Boom just didn't know that Diego would have a very unusual and cheating partner: a Boomie.	Tereza Temer	April 12, 2020
15	Relaxa, Wee!	Searching for Boomies can be very stressful. Boom decides to take Wee to relax at a spa in Bangkok, Thailand. However, Wee becomes so relaxed that Boom has to piss her off back in order to capture Boomie.	Tereza Temer	May 4, 2020
16	Aaatchimm!	A Boomie and the absence of the sun in Machu Picchu, Peru, drive a group of tourists and their guide crazy, who dominate the ruins and collect offerings to the Sun God. However, the greatest offering of all is yet to come, the great golden man.	Tereza Temer	April 17, 2020
17	Caçadas em Alto Ar	Balloons flying over the exotic region of Cappadocia, Turkey, are being attacked by a Boomie-Balloon and its captain, an air pirate, who will not rest until he is the only balloon in the sky. Wee and Boom must stop this crazy duo.	Rafael Baliú	March 20, 2020
18	Diverlândia	Wee and Boom are in Orlando, United States, at the famous amusement park Diverlandia. Wee reverts to being a hyperactive kid who just wants to have fun and doesn't care about capturing Boomie. Boom needs to convince her that it's worth being an adult again.	Ingrid Schmidt	March 27, 2020
19	Boonka	Wee and Boom are strolling through New Delhi, India, when they run into Boonka, Boom's brother. The trio discovers that the town is being controlled by a Boomie and a Boonkie (Boonka's Boomie), causing people to make offerings to them with the best they have. As much as there are differences between the brothers, Wee, Boom and Boonka have to work together to capture the two little creatures.	Tereza Temer	April 3, 2020
20	Boomieverso	Boom is organizing a surprise party for Wee, and so she doesn't find out, Boom hides her inside. Wee then discovers the strange world inside the Boom, where the Boomies live and all the sounds of the universe are stored. She is tricked by a trio of rebellious Boomies who want to get out of there, pretending to be enslaved. As Boom and friends rush to organize the party, Wee participates in an escape plan for her and the three little creatures.	Rafael Baliú	April 10, 2020
21	Tutankaboom	We are in the scorching region of the pyramids of Egypt, where apparently there is a Boomie on the run. Wee and Boom unearth a pyramid and follow its tracks only to find that Boomie has bewitched and brought to life the mummy of the famous Tutankhamun and his subjects. The mummy, however, seems to loathe Boom.	Ingrid Schmidt	April 10, 2020
22	Wee x Wee	A seemingly invisible Boomie attacked Wee and caused her to split into multiple Wees. Boom has to find out who the real Wee is so that together they can capture Boomie.	Tereza Temer	April 17, 2020
23	Boom-Minável Homem das Neves	In the icy forests of Canada lives the Bigfoot – or at least that's what Débora, a researcher, believes. Her brother's disappearance and the footprints on the ground lead her to believe that Boom is the Bigfoot that disappeared with her brother. Wee and Boom are captured and have to deal with the researcher and a creature that appears to be the real Bigfoot.	Rafael Baliú	April 24, 2020
24	Wee Mar	Wee and Boom dive into the depths of the sea in Port-au-Prince, Haiti, to unravel the mystery of a huge monster that is attacking the harbor and various underwater objects, leaving a huge amount of bite marks.	Ingrid Schmidt	May 1, 2020
25	O Mestre Dan Pingentes	Wee and Boom visit Waikato, New Zealand, where they filmed the "Master of Pendants" series, but they find themselves surrounded by magical creatures. Believing this to be the work of a Boomie, they become fantastical warriors to set out on an epic adventure.	Dan Velez	May 8, 2020
26	Wee Moon	Wee and Boom go to the Moon and face a Boomie who has an evil plan to destroy Earth.	Rafael Baliú	May 24, 2020
