= Boy Girl Dog Cat Mouse Cheese =

Animated television series

- Genre: Comedy; Surreal comedy; Adventure
- Created by: Jeff Harter
- Based on: Original concept by Jeff Harter and Cloudco Entertainment
- Developed by: Jeff Harter
- Written by: Gary Timpson
- Screenplay by: Davis Doi
- Story by: Matthieu Giner
- Directed by: Jérémy Guiter (season 1); Matthieu Giner (seasons 1–2); Ophélie Mahé (season 3); Mireille Tram (season 3)
- Voices of: Justin Michael; Alyson Leigh Rosenfeld; Justin Anselmi; Erica Schroeder; Abe Goldfarb; H.D. Quinn; Laurie Hymes; Samantha Cooper; Ryan Nicolls; Samara Naeymi; Cristina Pitter; Serra Hirsch; Marion Toro (seasons 2–3); Francesca Colo (seasons 2–3); Barron B. Bass (seasons 2–3); Mike Pollock (seasons 2–3); Gary Mack (season 3); Christina Martin (season 3)
- Theme music composer: Mathieu Rosenzweig; Benjamin Nakache
- Opening theme: "Boy Girl Dog Cat Mouse Cheese" Theme (performed by Kaycie Chase and Daniel Walker)
- Composers: Mathieu Rosenzweig; Benjamin Nakache
- Countries of origin: United States; France; Ireland
- Original languages: English; French
- No. of seasons: 3
- No. of episodes: 156 (list of episodes)

Production
- Executive producers: Philippe Alessandri; Harry Chaskin (season 1); Davis Doi (season 1); Sean Gorman; Gary Timpson; Andrew Kavanagh; Gene Laufenberg (season 1); Karen Vermeulen (season 1); Ryan Wiesbrock; Ian Lambur (seasons 2–3); Daniel Barnes (seasons 2–3); For CBBC (seasons 2–3): Jo Allen; For Cofiloisirs (season 1): Jean-Baptiste Souchier; Sylvie El Sayegh; Pauline Daudier de Cassini; For Fís Éireann/Screen Ireland: Dearbhla Regan (season 1); Andrew Byrne (seasons 2–3)
- Producers: Léan Duffy (Line, seasons 2–3)
- Editors: Ivy Buirette (season 1); Stéphanie Jans (season 1); Johan Decaix (seasons 2–3)
- Running time: 11 minutes
- Production companies: Cloudco Entertainment; Watch Next Media; Kavaleer Productions

Original release
- Network: CBBC (United Kingdom); Gulli, Canal J (Note: Seasons 1–2) and Disney Channel (Note: Season 3) (France); RTÉ2 (TRTÉ) and RTÉjr (Ireland); DeA Kids (Italy); Super RTL (Germany, Season 1-2)
- Release: 31 October 2019 – 20 November 2024

Boy Girl Dog Cat Mouse Cheese (French: Boy Girl, etc.) is an animated television series based on an original concept by Jeff Harter and Cloudco Entertainment, and directed by Jérémy Guiter for Season 1, Matthieu Giner for Season 2, and Ophélie Mahé and Mireille Tram for Season 3. The series is an American-French-Irish co-production between Cloudco Entertainment, Watch Next Media, and Kavaleer Productions, and produced with the participation of the BBC, Gulli (Seasons 1–2), RTÉ, Canal J (Seasons 1–2), De Agostini Editore S.p.A., Groupe M6, Super RTL and Disney Channel France (all Season 3).

The show originally premiered in the United Kingdom on CBBC on October 31, 2019. The second season premiered in January 2022, followed by the third in November 2023.

== Synopsis ==
The show centers around a boy, a girl, a dog, a cat, a mouse, and a sentient piece of cheese, each respectively named after what their identities are, who live together as a dysfunctional family. Despite their constant misadventures, the six characters always end up reconciling and strengthening the bonds that unite them.

== Characters ==
- Boy (voiced by Justin Michael in English and Alexandre Nguyen in French) is an anxious, expressive and often optimistic teenage boy. He is the oldest and tries to be the most mature of the group, but finds himself at odds with his unique siblings. He also takes a liking to his crazy passion for bobbleheads and hanging out with his five other siblings. His siblings find him very boring and old-fashioned.
- Girl (voiced by Alyson Leigh Rosenfeld in English and Adeline Chetail in French) is a rambunctious, very boisterous and rebellious teenage girl. She is close to Boy, but challenges his authority. She is rather apathetic, provocative, and a prankster, usually being seen on her cellphone. She enjoys cosplaying as her favorite comic book characters.
- Dog (voiced by Justin Anselmi in English and Jérémie Bedrune in French) is a male talking German Shepherd/Terrier Mix according to concept art. He is boisterous, athletic and active, with a slight streak of ridiculous immaturity to his dog-like personality. As he is very obedient and strongly supportive of his siblings, he often has trouble refusing orders, especially from Boy, his best friend.
- Cat (voiced by Erica Schroeder in English and Magali Rosenzweig in French) is a female Turkish Van who behaves bizarrely and possesses uniquely strange abilities. Apart from the episodes "Confession Cat", "Mildred the Bobblehead" and "Paperback Mountain", she rarely speaks (unlike the other pets in the family), usually meowing like a regular cat. She has an annoying tendency to squint (divergent strabismus), cough up hairballs, and sit still, but when the opportunity arises, she can become very agitated for a while. Instead of walking, she sometimes rolls around.
- Mouse (voiced by Abe Goldfarb in English and Jérémy Prévost in French) is an anthropomorphic, male talking stuffed mouse. He is intelligent, rational and the most mature of the group, but is a mad scientist who often makes really crazy and irrational machines that sometimes cause more problems than they solve.
- Cheese (also voiced by Erica Schroeder in English and Marie Nonnenmacher in French) is a female, anthropomorphic piece of limburger cheese. She is very dramatic, narcissistic and selfish, and fancies herself a diva. She enjoys music, dancing, singing, throwing parties and writing fantasy novels. She is incapable of keeping a secret.

== Episodes ==
Season	Episodes	Originally released	
Season	Episodes	First released	Last released
1	52	October 31, 2019	October 13, 2020
2	52	January 3, 2022	August 17, 2022
3	52	November 20, 2023	November 20, 2024

== Production ==
Boy Girl Dog Cat Mouse Cheese is produced by Cloudco Entertainment in the United States, Watch Next Media in France, and Kavaleer Productions in Ireland. The series is aimed towards children between the ages of 6 and 12. Sophie Yates from Bulldog Licensing explained that Boy Girl Dog Cat Mouse Cheese brings together today's kids and tweens, and tackles the topic of blended families with humor and fun.

The series was known to have been in production since 2006, and was intended to be made for Cartoon Network. In 2011, Cloudco first filed a trademark for its title. Originally it was to be produced by Cloudco Entertainment along with Mercury Filmworks in Canada, as per an agreement by the Writers' Guild of Canada. The trademark expired in 2014 and was renewed, with Disney XD and Teletoon as the networks intending to air the series as of 2015, but it expired again in 2017.

The first season premiered on October 31, 2019, the second on January 3, 2022, and the third on November 20, 2023.

On March 31, 2025, Boy Girl Dog Cat Mouse Cheese joined the catalog and digital channels of Superprod Studio's international sales and distribution division, Superights Kids & Family, following Watch Next's partnership with Superprod Group back in October 2024. Watch Next Media merged its distribution arm Kids First Distribution into Superprod's distribution subsidiary Superights Kids & Family, with Watch Next Media's production catalogue joining Superights, gaining control of the Watch Next Media programming catalogue, and becoming the biggest international distributor of children's programs.

== Broadcast ==
Boy Girl Dog Cat Mouse Cheese premiered on CBBC in the United Kingdom on 31 October 2019, and daily episode premieres continued from 19 November. The show is also streaming on Netflix in certain regions.

On 6 January 2020, the series initially premiered on Family Channel in Canada, but was moved to Family CHRGD in the fall of 2021. On 15 June, the second part of season 1 premiered on CBBC in the United Kingdom. It premiered in France on Gulli on 23 March and on Canal J on 1 January 2021. Episodes of the series are broadcast on some international channels of Disney Channel (France, Belgium, Netherlands, Poland and CEE), its sister channel Disney XD and Cartoon Network (Africa, Australia, New Zealand and Southeast Asia).

On February 15, 2021, this series was broadcast for the first time in Germany on the channels Super RTL and TOGGO Plus. On 12 June, Finnish channel Yle TV2 began broadcasting the series during the "Galaxi" programming block and as of 9 July 2021, SIC K has been broadcasting the series dubbed into European Portuguese.

In April 2022, HBO Max Latinoamérica added the series to their platform for broadcast across Latin America, with a Spanish-language dub, along with a Brazilian Portuguese dub in addition to the Latin American Spanish dub.

The show has yet to broadcast in the United States although produced and dub made in said country

== Awards ==
In May 2021, Boy Girl Dog Cat Mouse Cheese was nominated for the 'Best Animated Kids Series 6+' and 'Best Music' categories at the Irish Animation Awards in 2021, with Baljeet Rai and Henry Gifford nominated for the 'Best Writer' award for the episode "Neighborhood Watchdog".
