= Typpö =

Typpö is a Finnish surname. Notable people with the surname include:

- Leonard Typpö (1868–1922), Finnish farmer, lay preacher, and politician
- Taneli Typpö (1878–1960), Finnish farmer and politician

== See also ==
- Teppo (name)
