= List of Gigantosaurus episodes =

The following is a list of episodes from the series Gigantosaurus.

== Series overview ==
Season	Segments	Episodes	Originally released	
Season	Segments	Episodes	First released	Last released
1	52	26	January 18, 2019	February 29, 2020
2	52	26	January 4, 2021	June 28, 2021
3	52	26	August 9, 2021	November 14, 2022

=== Season 1 (2019–20) ===
All episodes in this season were written by Dave Benjoya, Wagner Cardena, Mike de Sève, Jordan Gershowitz, Baptiste Grosfilley, Bart Jennett, Suzanne Lang, Charles Henri Moarbes, Jacqueline Moody, Pierre Olivier, Maria O'Loughlin, Annabelle Perrichon, Cécile Polard, Franck Salomé, Nicolas Seidel, Alain Vallejo, Joseph Vitale, and Fernando Worcel and storyboarded by Jérémie Bouet, Nadia Brahimi, Farouk Cherfi, Pierre Fassel, Miguel Gaban, Ahmed Gerrouache, Sylvain Girault, and Philippe Saunier.

No. overall	No. in season	Title	Original release date	U.S. viewers (millions)
1	1	"Mazu Takes a Chance"	January 18, 2019	0.47
1	1	"The Lost Egg"	January 18, 2019	0.47
Mazu Takes a Chance: Cror and Totor kidnap Dragonfly and refuse to hand her over unless the friends bring them a scale from Giganto, something that doesn't always go as planned. The Lost Egg: The friends finds a mysterious egg and set out to find its parents.
2	2	"Saving Ayati"	January 18, 2019	0.47
2	2	"The Crevice"	January 18, 2019	0.47
Saving Ayati: Ayati ends up on her side and can't get up, forcing the friends to creatively find a way to right her. Unfortunately, their current plan involves baiting Giganto to play a part of their scheme. The Crevice: An earthquake strands the friends by trapping them on the other side of a crevice, forcing them to find a creative way out.
3	3	"The Island"	January 25, 2019	N/A
3	3	"Don’t Cave In"	January 25, 2019	N/A
The Island: Bill and an aquaphobic Rocky get stranded on an island with Giganto, and they have to get off before he and Termy wake up. Don't Cave In: After Gigantosaurus scares them into a cave, the friends have to escape while avoiding the Shriekasaurus.
4	4	"Because Triceratops!"	February 1, 2019	N/A
4	4	"Rock Out"	February 1, 2019	N/A
Because Triceratops!: Tiny has to practice for the Triceratops Trials, but she can't take things seriously enough, and Giganto gets Trey stuck in quicksand. Rock Out: Rocky sets out on a solo mission to stop the ground wobbler, but learns the hard way even tough dinos like Giganto need help.
5	5	"Air Archie"	February 8, 2019	N/A
5	5	"The Imitator"	February 8, 2019	N/A
Air Archie: The friends attempt to find a way to get Archie to fly in the sky. Unfortunately, he ends up on the back of Giganto. The Imitator: Rocky sets out to be like Giganto by imitating his actions, which ends up going worse than he planned.
6	6	"The Biggest Hero"	February 15, 2019	0.50
6	6	"Think Quick"	February 15, 2019	0.50
The Biggest Hero: Rocky gets jealous when Tiny ends up as a better hero than he is. Unfortunately, his heroic attempts backfire. Think Quick: Mazu sets out to increase her speed by any means possible.
7	7	"Please Don't Pick the Flowers"	February 22, 2019	0.38
7	7	"No Joke"	February 22, 2019	0.38
Please Don't Pick the Flowers: After Mazu gives Bill a flower as a once in a lifetime treat, his stomach craves more, but he isn't allowed to pick more. Unfortunately, both Rocky and Tiny are roped into his addiction, and the system of life crashes in Cretacia. No Joke: Tiny sets out to find someone to tells jokes to, but quickly finds out that Dilo's sense of humor overruns his common sense.
8	8	"Seeing Stars"	March 1, 2019	0.49
8	8	"A Tiny Triumph"	March 1, 2019	0.49
Seeing Stars: Mazu drags her friends in the canyon to map out the stars, but the raptors plan on giving the foursome a spooky and hectic night. A Tiny Triumph: When the friends get lost in the desert, Tiny's artistic talents manage to save the day.
9	9	"Giganto's Laugh"	March 8, 2019	0.44
9	9	"Treasure!"	March 8, 2019	0.44
Giganto's Laugh: The friends split up to gather supplies to treat Giganto's toothache, but Tiny is unable to take things seriously. Eventually, it ends up helping others treat the giant beast. Treasure!: All of Cretacia is divided by greed because of a golden pebble.
10	10	"Invisi-Bill"	March 15, 2019	0.50
10	10	"Patchy Sees the Light"	March 15, 2019	0.50
Invisi-Bill: Tired of always being found first, Bill seeks out a way to hide effectively. His friends choose to fake him being invisible, but it leads to mayhem. Patchy Sees the Light: Mazu sets out to help Patchy deal with his poor eyesight. Unfortunately, he refuses any gadget they provide if he can't reach his face.
11	11	"Differing Dino Tales"	March 22, 2019	N/A
11	11	"Big Bill"	March 22, 2019	N/A
Differing Dino Tales: Mazu sets out to find the true story of the boulder that knocked over her new slide. Big Bill: Wanting to grow as fast as he can, Bill sets out to find a mysterious dinosaur who can help him.
12	12	"Talent-o-saurus"	March 29, 2019	0.49
12	12	"Marsh the Raptor"	March 29, 2019	0.49
Talent-o-saurus: Rocky neglects to practice before a talent show, landing him in a bad situation. Marsh the Raptor: The raptors plot to use Marsh as a pawn to scare Giganto, by repelling the large dino with a smelly flower bouquet.
13	13	"The Best Crest"	April 5, 2019	N/A
13	13	"The Drought"	April 5, 2019	N/A
The Best Crest: The Giga Flower is in bloom and causing Rocky to have the stuffies, leading his friends to go and help him. Unfortunately, Cror and Totor have stolen his favorite Giganto card, and they won't return it until Rocky brings the raptors a Giga Flower to eat. To make matters worse, his stuffies keep him from effectively sneaking past Giganto. The Drought: After Tiny and Bill broke the rules, a broken mushroom clogs the water supply to Cretacia, placing the land in a severe drought. Unfortunately, they get trapped trying to fix the problem, forcing the others to enlist Giganto.
14	14	"Racing Giganto"	April 19, 2019	0.72
14	14	"Bill's Night Feast"	April 19, 2019	0.72
Racing Giganto: The friends try to beat Giganto in their new carts, but the machines wreck everything in their path. Bill's Night Feast: Bill suddenly wakes up not hungry and, to add to his horror, all of his secret food stashes have been emptied overnight. Looking for the bandit responsible, it turns out that Bill had been eating in his sleep, and he had emptied his own stashes overnight.
15	15	"The Big Mean Green"	May 10, 2019	0.46
15	15	"How Giganto Got His Roar"	May 10, 2019	0.46
The Big Mean Green: When Giganto gets blamed for stranding Terminonator, the friends must clear his name before the other dinos evict him from Cretacia. How Giganto Got His Roar: Falling for a myth of a bedtime story, Rocky and Marsh set out to capture Giganto's roar. Unfortunately, it places them in danger.
16	16	"The Challenge"	June 7, 2019	0.51
16	16	"Giganto’s Boss"	June 7, 2019	0.51
The Challenge: The friends have to win a game to reclaim the playground from the raptors, but Bill is less than confident in his abilities. Giganto's Boss: The gang believes Rocky to be Giganto's boss, but things quickly go downhill when he tries to exploit it.
17	17	"Follow the Leader"	June 28, 2019	0.39
17	17	"An Artist Is Born"	June 28, 2019	0.39
Follow the Leader: Rocky neglects to care for his friends and refuses to step down as leader. An Artist is Born: After Trey hurts his foot, Tiny convinces him to paint with them. Unfortunately, he can't seem to find an art style that works for him and his pride is soon wounded as well. Luckily, they find a style in time to stop the raptors.
18	18	"Bill’s Broken Promise"	July 12, 2019	0.43
18	18	"Born Tree"	July 12, 2019	0.43
Bill's Broken Promise: Bill accidentally tells others about Rocky's birthday present, resulting in a game of steal and return. Born Tree: Tiny decides to take care of a tree sapling, but grows so attached to it she insists on keeping it around for much longer than recommended.
19	19	"A Giganto Power"	July 26, 2019	0.41
19	19	"Crying Wolfasaurus"	July 26, 2019	0.41
A Giganto Power: Rocky gains a giant Giganto tail from Mazu, but he quickly learns that a giant tail is a big responsibility. Crying Wolfasaurus: When Bill begins calling Giganto for his own gain, nobody believes him when Giganto actually shows up.
20	20	"The Five Friends"	August 30, 2019	0.24
20	20	"A Tiny Favor"	August 30, 2019	0.24
The Five Friends: The long-lost crest of the five friends is rediscovered, but the fifth friend is unknown. Can Rocky, Bill, Tiny and Mazu fix their friendship and discover who the fifth friend is? A Tiny Favor: After Archie saves her from getting flattened by a boulder, Tiny sets off after him to repay the favor... Whether he wants to or not!
21	21	"Coco Bill”"	September 6, 2019	0.29
21	21	"”Brothers and Sisters"	September 6, 2019	0.29
Coco Bill: Bill refuses to go home without coconuts, and he intends on collecting all of them before Rugo does. Once he collects them, he doesn't intend on giving them back, causing a roar of trouble for his friends. Brothers and Sisters: Tiny and Totor start a band, while Cror and Trey butt heads going after them.
22	22	"The Floating Stone”"	October 26, 2019	0.40
22	22	"“The Light in the Storm"	October 26, 2019	0.40
The Floating Stone: After they interrupt her meditation, Terminonator keeps Tiny and Bill hostage until Rocky and Mazu bring her a mythical floating stone. The Light in the Storm: Bill and Marsh get separated from the others in the fog, and a storm is on the way. To make matters worse, Bill lacks confidence in himself as a leader.
23	23	"Frozen Giganto”"	November 9, 2019	0.58
23	23	"“Dinosia"	November 9, 2019	0.58
Frozen Giganto: When Giganto makes a long absence, the ecosystem order spirals out of control, sending the friends on a hunt for the large dino in the frozen lands. He turns out to be frozen by an avalanche, and their mission? Melt the ice around him. Dinosia: Ayati directs the friends to Dinosia for new things to discover, only to find that it was only a fib to lead them on a new adventure in Cretacia.
24	24	"The Shortest Day"	December 7, 2019	0.34
24	24	"Mazu's Comet"	December 7, 2019	0.34
The Shortest Day: Tiny sets out to plan a party on the shortest day of the year. Mazu's Comet: Mazu is determined to see her comet, but when things take a rough turn, she gets help from those she had helped before.
25	25	"A Very Sticky Problem"	January 13, 2020	N/A
25	25	"Forward Marsh"	January 13, 2020	N/A
A Very Sticky Problem: An incident with coconuts and tar leaves Mazu and Cror stuck back-to-back. The two end up sharing an unusual bonding experience as they try to get unstuck. Forward Marsh: Rocky rushes the crew to get the best spots to watch the winter lights, but his impatience gets the better of him and his shortcuts lead to disaster. Luckily, taking it slow got them a good spot.
26	26	"Goodbye, Giganto! Part 1"	February 29, 2020	0.40
26	26	"Goodbye, Giganto! Part 2"	February 29, 2020	0.40
Goodbye, Giganto! Part 1: Mount Oblivion gets clogged with a meteorite and, fearing a lava eruption, the herd is forced to move, with Giganto left behind. They friends decide to prevent this by breaking the meteor. Goodbye, Giganto! Part 2: Giganto leaves for parts unknown. The Terminonator then takes over Cretacia, leading the friends to rebel.

=== Season 2 (2021) ===
All episodes were written by Hervé Benedetti, Françoise Boubil, Wagner Cardena, Shannon George, Jordan Gershowitz, Baptise Grosfilley, Anais LeBeau, Laura Macler, Jacqueline Moody, Diane Morel, Eric Noto, Annabelle Perrichon, Cécile Polard, Nicolas Robin, Franck Salomé, Nicolas Sedel, Kevin Strader, Alain Vallejo, and Fernando Worcel and storyboarded by Jerémie Bouet, Nadia Brahimi, Fraçois Caillier, Farouk Cherfi, Paul-Henri Ferrant, Miguel Gaban, Fabrice Leminier, Elvira Pinto, Hélène Sauvagnat, and Sandrine Sekulak.

No. overall	No. in season	Title	Original release date	U.S. viewers (millions)
27	1	"Termy, Come Home!"	January 4, 2021	0.24
27	1	"Rocky the Record Breaker"	January 4, 2021	0.24
Termy, Come Home!: Termy leaves Cretecia which the locals briefly enjoy, but they soon want her back when her absence causes problems in the pond. Rocky the Record Breaker: When the young dinosaurs finds a tablet about someone who holds many records, Rocky tries to break any of them.
28	2	"Once in a Pink Moon"	January 11, 2021	0.23
28	2	"A Giganto Gallery"	January 11, 2021	0.23
Once in a Pink Moon: Bill is less interested in change, and is declining any invitation from his friends who want to show him something new. A Giganto Gallery: Tiny gets jealous when Marsh's art starts getting more attention despite not being as good as hers.
29	3	"Giganto Games"	January 18, 2021	0.34
29	3	"Coconuts for Coco-phones"	January 18, 2021	0.34
Giganto Games: In a multi-sporting event featuring teams of two dinosaurs, Cror encourages Bill to employ illegal tactics to gain some advantage. Coconuts for Coco-Phones: Mazu creates mobile phones out of coconuts, and gives one to every dinosaur in Cretacia.
30	4	"Mini Giganto"	January 25, 2021	0.19
30	4	"Singosaurus"	January 25, 2021	0.19
Mini Giganto: Rocky has a statuette of Giganto which he no longer plays, and his friends suggest he should give it to someone, but Rocky finds it hard. Singosaurus: Cror and Trey need to get over their differences as they are selected to sing together at the show.
31	5	"A New Home for Leon"	February 1, 2021	0.24
31	5	"Mirror Mirror"	February 1, 2021	0.24
A New Home for Leon: Rocky, Bill, Tiny, and Mazu befriend a sea turtle named Leon, and try to find him a home in their neighborhood. Mirror Mirror: Tiny becomes addicted looking at her face on a reflective rock.
32	6	"I Heart Giganto"	February 8, 2021	0.21
32	6	"Guardians of the Herds"	February 8, 2021	0.21
I Heart Giganto: Tiny ponders on how to spend Togetherness Day with Giganto. Guardians of the Herds: Hegan and Trey teach Rocky, Bill, Tiny, and Mazu about keeping Cretacia safe for its inhabitants, but an impatient Rocky unwittingly makes things worse.
33	7	"Ayati's Big Birthday"	February 15, 2021	0.29
33	7	"A New Best T"	February 15, 2021	0.29
Ayati's Big Birthday: The four little dinos want to give Ayati presents for her 200th birthday. A New Best T: The Raptors bring T-Rex to Cretacia and Rocky finds him good fun to play with.
34	8	"Top Dino"	February 22, 2021	0.28
34	8	"Dinos to the Moon"	February 22, 2021	0.28
Top Dino: Tiny becomes the Top Dino for the day. Dinos to the Moon: Mazu creates a rocket to fly to the moon. Unfortunately, her failed attempt to fly to the moon lands herself, her friends, and Rugo in an unknown part of Cretacia.
35	9	"Don't Bug Bill"	March 1, 2021	0.21
35	9	"Super Marsh"	March 1, 2021	0.21
Don't Bug Bill: Bill runs off with Marsh when Mazu showcases the bugs. T decides to follow them and scare Bill by pretending to be a bug. Super Marsh: Marsh admires the four little dinos and their incredible talents that are like super powers.
36	10	"Secret-Saurus"	March 8, 2021	0.21
36	10	"Party of One"	March 8, 2021	0.21
Secret-Saurus: When Rocky is unhappy with his present from Tiny, he gets rid of it. Party of One: Bill tries to have a party to celebrate getting the first coconuts of Spring, but his friends decide to take it over.
37	11	"Dino Dash"	March 15, 2021	0.25
37	11	"Good Idea"	March 15, 2021	0.25
Dino Dash: The four young dinos create a new board game. While going out to build the volcano, Tiny and Mazu disagree on whether it should be artistic or scientific. Good Idea: The snow is melting. Mazu and Trey have different ideas on how to prevent Cretacia from being flooded.
38	12	"Archaeop-Tricks"	March 22, 2021	0.20
38	12	"Blind to Fashion"	March 22, 2021	0.20
Archaeop-Tricks: When T-Rex teases Archie about being unable to fly, Mazu comes to his defense. Blind to Fashion: Giganto starts a trend when a banana peel gets stuck to the top of his head.
39	13	"Plink, Plonk, and Plunk"	March 29, 2021	N/A
39	13	"The Caterpillar Contest"	March 29, 2021	N/A
Pink, Plonk and Plunk: The four dinos meet three new friends named Plink, Plonk and Plunk. The Caterpillar Contest: the dinos have a contest to see who can take care of their caterpillar the best.
40	14	"The Star Stone"	April 5, 2021	N/A
40	14	"Capa-Bill"	April 5, 2021	N/A
The Star Stone: Mazu wants to be the first to find a meteorite that landed in the desert. Capa-Bill: Leon likes to help Bill, but realizes he has to learn to do things for himself.
41	15	"Rugo the Roommate"	April 12, 2021	N/A
41	15	"The Winner"	April 12, 2021	N/A
Rugo the Roommate: When Rugo's burrow floods, the four dinos invite her to live with them temporarily. The Winner: Tiny has hidden colored, egg-shaped stones around Cretacia for a treasure hunt, but Rocky decides that he wants to find all of the stones so nobody else can win.
42	16	"The Big Ig"	April 19, 2021	N/A
42	16	"Saving Snugglesaurus"	April 19, 2021	N/A
The Big Ig: Iggy is the proud caretaker of a berry bog but must challenge T to a game of Capture the Flag to remain in charge. Saving Snugglesaurus: Rocky has to watch his baby cousin for the day.
43	17	"The Singing Chef"	April 26, 2021	N/A
43	17	"The Dino Drone"	April 26, 2021	N/A
The Singing Chef: Tiny writes a musical called "Mighty Dinosaurs" but she can't find the right dino to play the lead, until she finds out that Bill can sing very well when he is preparing food. The Dino Drone: Hegan is jealous of Mazu's drone that can fly anywhere in Cretacia.
44	18	"Scary Bill"	May 3, 2021	N/A
44	18	"The Dino Finder"	May 3, 2021	N/A
Scary Bill: Bill ventures out into the scary darkness to find ingredients for his pumpkin bread. The Dino Finder: When Plink,Plonk, and Plunk gone missing. The four dinos and Leon set out find them, while Rocky claims he's the greatest dino finder ever.
45	19	"The Snow Cave"	May 10, 2021	N/A
45	19	"Good Dino"	May 10, 2021	N/A
The Snow Cave: Bill, Mazu and Rocky head to the Frozen Land in search of a snow cave just as a blizzard comes. Good Dino: Tiny wants to create a statue of Cretacia's greatest hero out of a big boulder.
46	20	"The Time Capsule"	May 17, 2021	N/A
46	20	"Marsh O Saurus"	May 17, 2021	N/A
The Time Capsule: When Rugo accidentally unearths a time capsule Ayati made with her friend 100 years ago, the four little dinos decide they want to make one too. Marsh O Saurus: Marsh wants to be like Giganto.
47	21	"The Great Sled Chase"	May 24, 2021	N/A
47	21	"Dino-Sitting"	May 24, 2021	N/A
The Great Sled Chase: A great chase ensues when T takes the sled filled with gifts for himself. Dino-Sitting: Rocky, Mazu Tiny and Bill find themselves with little siblings, and Mazu thinks she can watch them all.
48	22	"Master of the Elements"	June 1, 2021	N/A
48	22	"Cretacia's School for Dinos"	June 1, 2021	N/A
Master of the Elements: When Rocky learns that no one has made it to the end of the maze, he's determined to be the first! Cretacia's School for Dinos: The four little dinos open a school to share their knowledge with all Cretacians, but Cror decides to send Totor in to ruin the school.
49	23	"A Brush with Sadness"	June 7, 2021	N/A
49	23	"What If?"	June 7, 2021	N/A
A Brush with Sadness: Tiny mourns the loss of her favourite paintbrush when it falls apart. What If?: The dinos imagine what the world would be like if they were allowed to do whatever they wanted.
50	24	"Bill's Nose Knows"	June 14, 2021	N/A
50	24	"Big Brother, Big Sister"	June 14, 2021	N/A
Bill's Nose Knows: Bill is known for having the best sniffer in town. Big Brother, Big Sister: When Tiny's little sister comes along, Trey spends a great deal of time playing with her -- and not much time with Tiny.
51	25	"A Giant Success"	June 21, 2021	N/A
51	25	"The Stick in the Stone"	June 21, 2021	N/A
A Giant Success: When Giganto assists the kids, Tiny wants to thank him by throwing a tea party. The Stick in the Stone: Trey and T both think they're the toughest.
52	26	"A New Big Guy"	June 28, 2021	N/A
52	26	"Battle of the Titans"	June 28, 2021	N/A
A New Big Guy: When a big, new dinosaur arrives in Cretacia, Bill's instincts are telling him to stay away. Battle of the Titans: Spino, the massive villain, is intent on terrorizing and has trapped Giganto in his cave.

=== Season 3 (2021–22) ===
All episodes were written by Hervé Benedetti, Françoise Boubil, Wagner Cardena, Shannon George, Jordan Gershowitz, Baptise Grosfilley, Anais LeBeau, Laura Macler, Jacqueline Moody, Diane Morel, Eric Noto, Annabelle Perrichon, Cécile Polard, Nicolas Robin, Franck Salomé, Nicolas Sedel, Kevin Strader, Alain Vallejo, and Fernando Worcel and storyboarded by Jerémie Bouet, Nadia Brahimi, Fraçois Caillier, Farouk Cherfi, Paul-Henri Ferrant, Miguel Gaban, Fabrice Leminier, Elvira Pinto, Hélène Sauvagnat, and Sandrine Sekulak.

No. overall	No. in season	Title	Original release date	U.S. viewers (millions)
53	1	"Ayati's Great Adventure"	August 9, 2021	N/A
53	1	"King of the Horseshoe Crabs"	August 9, 2021	N/A
Ayati's Great Adventure: The baby dinos are proving to be a handful, especially when Ayati tries to care for them. King of the Horseshoe Crabs: The horseshoe crabs treat Rocky like a king after he inadvertently saves them from the scorpions.
54	2	"Bubble Bill"	August 16, 2021	N/A
54	2	"The Perfect Bone"	August 16, 2021	N/A
Bubble Bill: When Bill realizes just how indestructible weird fish bubbles are, he decides to live inside one. The Perfect Bone: Rugo and Ignatius each find the same, perfect, semicircle-shaped bone.
55	3	"Adventures in Egg Sitting"	August 23, 2021	N/A
55	3	"Rainbow's End"	August 23, 2021	N/A
Adventures in Egg Sitting: The four little dinos are tasked with watching Hegan's eggs, which are soon to hatch. But when the Raptors take one of the eggs away, Bill is left to look after the other one all on his own. Rainbow's End: When the dinos learn about a treasure at the end of a rainbow, Rocky is determined to find it! Unfortunately, the Raptors are also interested in finding the treasure.
56	4	"Termy Steps Out"	August 30, 2021	N/A
56	4	"The Tooth Fairy"	August 30, 2021	N/A
Termy Steps Out: Termy wants to visit her good friend Hegan's new babies, Pride and Joy. The Tooth Fairy: Rocky is excited when Giganto loses a tooth because that means the tooth fairy will visit and leave loot. The Raptors decide to have him lead them to Giganto's lair so they can take his bone.
57	5	"Wait For It!"	September 6, 2021	N/A
57	5	"Mr. Careful"	September 6, 2021	N/A
Wait For It!: Tiny, Rocky and Bill have a hard time being patient waiting for the lulu fruit to change color. Mr. Careful: Rocky borrows Mazu's kart and flies it as a plane, but he doesn't know how to fly.
58	6	"Tiny Tells"	September 13, 2021	N/A
58	6	"Sleeping Spino"	September 13, 2021	N/A
Tiny Tells: Tiny likes the attention she gets from announcing the news, so she starts a news service. Unfortunately, she soon starts getting carried away with her tall tales, and Spino soon shows up to cause more trouble. Sleeping Spino: Mazu decides to study Spino so that she can find out his weakness. But when she inadvertently wakes him up, he follows her to the dinos' den.
59	7	"Friendship Cards"	October 4, 2021	N/A
59	7	"The Missing Manual"	October 4, 2021	N/A
Friendship Cards: Tiny wants to help the dinos get along, so she invents a game to pair one dino with another. Mazu is partnered with Totor, Rocky with Cror, Bill with T-Rex and Tiny with Patchy. The Missing Manual: Mount Oblivion seems like it's going to blow, and Mazu needs to find her book to stop it.
60	8	"Brother Bill"	November 8, 2021	N/A
60	8	"Tricksteratops"	November 8, 2021	N/A
Brother Bill: Bill starts to feel like his sister might like Rocky more than him. Tricksteratops: Missy is good at magic tricks, so they encourage her to do a magic show, but things go awry when T-Rex decides to cause some chaos during the show.
61	9	"Council of Wise Dinos"	November 15, 2021	N/A
61	9	"Rockatastrophe"	November 15, 2021	N/A
Council of Wise Dinos: When a spot opens on the council due to Tritor's retirement, Mazu applies in hopes of solving the problem of Giganto waking everyone up too early. Rockatastrophe: Rocky becomes so fixated on helping to repair Archie's nest that he doesn't stop and think about what he is doing.
62	10	"The Bravest"	November 29, 2021	N/A
62	10	"The Sleepover"	November 29, 2021	N/A
The Bravest: Bill realizes bravery is doing something you're afraid of to help someone else. The Sleepover: After Mazu's science experiments backfires, the dinos have to evacuate the den for the night.
63	11	"Master of Nothing"	December 6, 2021	N/A
63	11	"Hooray for Totor"	December 6, 2021	N/A
Master of Nothing: Bill teaches Missy how to bake a pie, but a mix-up causes everyone to think that Missy's pie is better than Bill's. Hooray for Totor: When Totor sees other dinos get awarded for their talents, he sets out to find his talent.
64	12	"Sleepless in Cretacia"	January 31, 2022	N/A
64	12	"The Walnut Goblin"	January 31, 2022	N/A
Sleepless in Cretacia: The little dinos go sledding and Marsh wants to join them, but he hasn't had his nap yet. The Walnut Goblin: On the way to visit Hegan, Bill and Tiny find a walnut field and they search for nuts.
65	13	"Marsh's Lullaby"	February 7, 2022	N/A
65	13	"Fantastic Stories"	February 7, 2022	N/A
Marsh's Lullaby: The dinos discover Marsh can sing lullabies that put dinos to sleep. Fantastic Stories: When Rocky sees all the attention the babies give to Giganto, he gets a bit jealous and decides to tell them stories about some feats he claims to have accomplished.
66	14	"Giganto's Nightlight"	February 28, 2022	N/A
66	14	"A Job Half Done"	February 28, 2022	N/A
Giganto's Nighlight: While out for a stroll one evening, Mazu's brother wants to know about a glowing rock that they encounter, unaware that Spinosaurus is on the prowl once again. A Job Half Done: Rocky has to clean up his act in order to save his friends from danger.
67	15	"The Bill Way"	March 7, 2022	N/A
67	15	"Bye-Bye Butterfly"	March 7, 2022	N/A
The Bill Way: Bill harvests cycad leaves the Bill Way. Bye-Bye Butterfly: The dinos are excited to see the Empress butterflies as they pass by but when Rocky throws them off course they are in trouble with Spinosaurus.
68	16	"Mystery Hunters"	March 28, 2022	N/A
68	16	"Watching You"	March 28, 2022	N/A
Mystery Hunters: When word of a monster reaches the dinos, Mazu is determined to find it. Watching You: When the raptors swipe pies from the dinos, they get more than they expected when they swipe Leena too.
69	17	"Raiders of the Lost Shell"	April 4, 2022	N/A
69	17	"Super Dilo"	April 4, 2022	N/A
Raiders of the Lost Shell: Rocky plays with Tiny's cymbal shell without asking and breaks it. Super Dilo: The four dinos think Dilo is quite the hero when he protects them from Spinosaurus, when in reality, Giganto was the one who scared him off.
70	18	"Silly Saurus"	April 11, 2022	N/A
70	18	"Rock-a-Bye Baby"	April 11, 2022	N/A
Silly Saurus: Trey assigns Tiny the task of creating a triceratops training course for their baby sister Tory. Rock A Baby: Marsh wishes he had a little brother or sister, so he makes some out of rocks.
71	19	"The Juggle Buddies"	April 18, 2022	N/A
71	19	"Don't Look Back"	April 18, 2022	N/A
The Juggle Buddies: Bill enlists Totor to do juggling act with him to win a trophy at the show, but when Cror decides to try and take part, Bill sends her to get some coconuts. Unfortunately, Cror soon finds herself in trouble with Spinosaurus. Don't Look Back: Rocky is excited to run in the race, but when Rolo decides to run the race too, Rocky gets annoyed.
72	20	"Digging Dinos"	August 1, 2022	N/A
72	20	"After You"	August 1, 2022	N/A
Digging Dinos: Mazu decides to open a rock museum so everyone can enjoy treasures, but the Raptors and T-Rex are also after the treasures.. After You: Bill gives Archie a ride, but Archie doesn't want to stop riding, even when it's Missy's turn.
73	21	"Different Soaks"	August 15, 2022	N/A
73	21	"Rocket Rocky"	August 15, 2022	N/A
Different Soaks: When it's time for the babies to take baths, none of them want a bath. Rocket Rocky: Bill starts a food delivery service, and Rocky volunteers to be his driver.
74	22	"Mama Termy"	September 12, 2022	N/A
74	22	"The Shadow Show"	September 12, 2022	N/A
Mama Termy: Termy is coerced into babysitting Pride and Joy. The Shadow Show: Mazu invents a projector for story telling. But T and the raptors used the projector to make everyone think Spino's here.
75	23	"The Heat Stone"	September 26, 2022	N/A
75	23	"Team Crawly to the Rescue"	September 26, 2022	N/A
The Heat Stone: When Tiny, Mazu, and Plunk finds a stone that changes colors depending on how warm it is, Leon watches over his baby cousin. But when Tiny gets jealous of Mazu and Plunk thinking they can use the stone for scientific purposes, she throws it away. Team Crawly To The Rescue: When Giganto's foot gets caught in the quicksand, they need to get him out!
76	24	"One Wise Dino"	October 31, 2022	N/A
76	24	"The Lookout"	October 31, 2022	N/A
One Wise Dino: When Marsh wins the raffle for being a wise dino, Mazu isn't sure he's a good pick. The Lookout: When Mazu gets called away from the lookout, her besties take over, but they get distracted while keeping an eye out for any meteors.
77	25	"The Floaty Flower"	November 7, 2022	N/A
77	25	"One Day of Kindness"	November 7, 2022	N/A
The Floaty Flower: It's the babies first birthday and Marsh wants to give them a special present. One Day of Kindness: When T-Rex gets in trouble with Giganto, he has to promise that he'll be kind for the whole day.
78	26	"Through Mazu's Eyes"	November 14, 2022	N/A
78	26	"Through Giganto's Eyes"	November 14, 2022	N/A
Through Mazu's Eyes: When Mazu has to make an emergency landing on the island, Giganto won't let her leave. Through Giganto's Eyes: Mazu arrives at the Council to discover several dinosaurs charging Giganto with being mean.
