= Gigantosaurus (TV series) =

Animated preschool television series

- Genre: Adventure; Comedy
- Created by: Franck Salomé; Nicolas Sedel; Fernando Worcel
- Based on: Gigantosaurus by Jonny Duddle
- Directed by: Olivier Lelardoux
- Voices of: Vincent Tong; Dylan Schombing; Nicholas Holmes; Áine Sunderland; Nahanni Mitchell
- Opening theme: "Gigantosaurus, He's Really Enormous"
- Ending theme: "Gigantosaurus, He's Really Enormous" (instrumental)
- Countries of origin: France; Canada
- Original languages: French; English
- No. of seasons: 3
- No. of episodes: 78 (156 segments) (list of episodes)

Production
- Executive producer: Helene Maret
- Producer: Pierre Sissmann
- Running time: 11 minutes
- Production companies: Cyber Group Studios (2019–2025); Kaibou; Blue Spirit Studio

Original release
- Network: France 5; Disney Channel/Disney Junior
- Release: January 18, 2019 – November 14, 2022

Gigantosaurus is an animated preschool series created by Franck Salomé, Nicolas Sedel, Fernando Worcel and directed by Olivier Lelardoux based on the book by Jonny Duddle. The series is a co-production between the French animation studio Cyber Group Studios and Kaibou, with animation done by Canadian studio Blue Spirit Studio, with participation from Disney Channel and France Télévisions, and support from other Canadian companies.

The series premiered on January 18, 2019, on Disney Channel as part of the Disney Junior block, airing on its dedicated channel as well.

On December 11, 2019, the series was renewed for a second and third season. The second season premiered on January 4, 2021 and the third season premiered on August 9, 2021. As of June 2023, a fourth season was in production, but its status remains unknown following the liquidation of Cyber Group Studios in 2025.

== Premise ==
Based on the bestselling book by Jonny Duddle and publisher Templar, the series follows four curious young dinosaur friends named Rocky, Bill, Tiny, and Mazu as they go on adventures and learn about the titular dinosaur from the book the series is based on, the biggest, fiercest dinosaur of all: Gigantosaurus.

== Characters ==
=== Main ===
- Gigantosaurus/Giganto (voiced by Vincent Tong) is the titular character, a huge Giganotosaurus. Despite his seemingly vicious personality, he often aids the four little dinosaurs in their adventures. Giganto mainly communicates with growls and roars, but in "Goodbye, Giganto! Part 2", the friends discover he can speak.
- Rocky (voiced by Dylan Schombing) is a spunky young Parasaurolophus. He is initially unable to say the names of dinosaur species correctly, especially his own kind, but that issue is fixed in "The Singing Chef". His crest can be used as a traffic horn.
- Bill (voiced by Nicholas Holmes) is a timid young Brachiosaurus who likes to eat.
- Tiny (voiced by Áine Sunderland) is a playful young Triceratops who likes to draw pictures and tell jokes.
- Mazu (voiced by Nahanni Mitchell) is an inquisitive young Ankylosaurus who likes to study and build things.

=== Supporting ===
- Hegan (voiced by Heather Doerksen) is a clumsy Pteranodon.
- Trey (voiced by Vincent Tong) is a teen Triceratops who is Tiny's older brother.
- Archie (voiced by Brad Swaile) is a flightless Archaeopteryx.
- Rugo (voiced by Asia Mattu) is a Rugosodon with a big appetite and multiple eponymous cousins, as well as an odd one out named Larry, who can chew through rock.
- Ignatius (voiced by Adam Kirschner) is an unusually large Compsognathus.
- Ayati (voiced by Joanne Willson) is a 200-year-old (as of "Ayati's Big Birthday") Brachiosaurus.
- Dilo (voiced by Brad Swaile) is a Dilophosaurus with a mischievous sense of humor.
- Marsh (voiced by Benjamin Jacobson) is a young Stegosaurus. He is the only young dinosaur who walks on all fours. Despite being younger than the main characters, he is as big as the adults of his species. While most of the characters find stinky flowers repulsive, Marsh finds the smell pleasant.
- Patchy (voiced by Michael Daingerfield) is a Pachycephalosaurus with poor eyesight, and short arms that cannot reach his head.
- Dragonfly is a Meganeura who is friends with Mazu.
- Weird Fish are a school of Eusthenopteron who are friends with Bill.
- Dino Bees are a swarm of honeybees.
- Leon (voiced by Brenden Sunderland) is an Archelon who appears in Seasons 2 & 3.
- Plink, Plonk & Plunk (voiced by Caitlyn Bairstow, Tabitha St. Germain and Andrea Libman, respectively) are three friendly Ichthyosaurus that live in the lake. The purple-marked Plink is very athletic, the blue-marked Plonk is very creative and the green-marked Plunk is very smart. They appear in Seasons 2 & 3.
- Rolo (voiced by Asia Mattu) is a baby Parasaurolophus who is Rocky's baby cousin who appears in Seasons 2 & 3 following his debut appearance in "The Lost Egg".
- Leena is a baby Brachiosaurus who is Bill's baby sister. She appears in Seasons 2 & 3.
- Tori is a baby Triceratops who is Trey and Tiny's baby sister. She appears in Seasons 2 & 3.
- Zac is a baby Ankylosaurus who is Mazu's baby brother. He appears in Seasons 2 & 3.
- Pride & Joy are Baby Pteranodons who are Hegan's children. Pride is the purple boy and Joy is the pink girl. They first appear in the Season 3 episode, "Adventures In Egg-Sitting". Although Joy was born first, Pride always gets top billing.
- Missy (voiced by Cathy Weseluck) An eccentric Incisivosaurus who first appears in the Season 3 episode, "The Tooth Fairy".

=== Antagonists ===
- Cror & Totor (voiced by Shannon Chan-Kent and Samuel Vincent, respectively) are a pair of Velociraptor siblings who like to pick on the other characters. Cror is the smarter and stingier green female, while Totor is the more dimwitted and incompetent red male.
- Termy (voiced by Jennifer Cameron) is a villainous Terminonatator who owns the residents' lake. She often tries to take over the savannah. It is later revealed she is Hegan’s best friend.
- T-Rex (voiced by Alessandro Juliani) is a mean Tyrannosaurus rex who likes to show off, and thinks he's better than Giganto. He first appears in the Season 2 episode, "A New Best T".
- Spino — A massive, villainous Spinosaurus who is intent on terrorizing. First appears in the Season 2 episodes, "A New Big Guy" & "Battle of the Titans".
- Scorpion is a Pulmonoscorpius. They often appear in Season 1, then once in Season 2 and twice in Season 3.

=== Additional ===
- Arthropleura
- Butterfly
- Carnivorous plant
- Diplocaulus
- Grasshopper
- Horseshoe crab
- Spider

== Episodes ==
Season	Segments	Episodes	Originally released	
Season	Segments	Episodes	First released	Last released
1	52	26	January 18, 2019	February 29, 2020
2	52	26	January 4, 2021	June 28, 2021
3	52	26	August 9, 2021	November 14, 2022

== Broadcast ==
On May 4, 2017, the series was picked up by France Télévisions and Super RTL. At that time, except for India and Taiwan, Disney Junior had agreed to carry the show starting in 2019. RAI (Italy), Canadian Broadcasting Corporation and Netflix procured the show by November 14, 2018. The show was premiered on the Disney Channel and DisneyNow in the United States as part of Disney Junior on January 18, 2019. The show premiered on Disney Junior in Canada on January 19, on Disney Junior in the United Kingdom and Ireland on April 29, on Trans TV in Indonesia, and for French Canada, the show premiered on Ici Radio-Canada Télé on September 19, 2020. It also aired on Tiny Pop in the UK.

== Merchandise ==
=== Home media ===
In 2020, NCircle Entertainment signed a deal with Cyber Group Studios to secure the North American DVD rights to Gigantosaurus.

A single-disc DVD titled "The Biggest, Fiercest, Dinosaur of All!" was released on January 6, 2020, and contained 8 episodes. Another single-disc DVD titled "Dino Tales" was released on April 21, 2020, and contains 8 more episodes. A Volume set on the first season was released on September 1, 2020, and has the first 26 episodes of the first series. A second volume set was released on June 4, 2021, and contains the rest of Series 1.

The first Series 2 DVD - "We're in This Together" was released on November 15, 2022, once again with eight episodes, followed up with "Adventures of Team Dino!" on January 24, 2023, with eight more episodes, and "Dino Discovery" on May 23, 2023, once again having eight episodes.

=== Toyline ===
The show has merchandising agreements with Jakks Pacific to roll out Gigantosaurus toys in Autumn 2019.

=== Video games ===
A video game based on the show was announced in July 2019. It was developed by Wild Sphere and published by Outright Games for the PlayStation 4, Xbox One, Nintendo Switch, and PC in March 2020. In September 2022, Outright Games announced another title - Gigantosaurus: Dino Kart!. It was developed by 3DClouds and published by Outright Games for the Xbox One, Xbox Series X, Xbox Series S, PlayStation 4, PlayStation 5, Nintendo Switch & Microsoft Windows for release in February 2023.
