= List of Boy Girl Dog Cat Mouse Cheese episodes =

The following is a list of episodes from the series Boy Girl Dog Cat Mouse Cheese.

== Series overview ==
Season	Episodes	Originally released	
Season	Episodes	First released	Last released
1	52	October 31, 2019	October 13, 2020
2	52	January 3, 2022	August 17, 2022
3	52	November 20, 2023	November 20, 2024

== Episodes ==
=== Season 1 (2019–20) ===
No. overall	No. in season	Title	Directed by	Written by	Original release date	Prod. code
1	1	"Greb Nefual E Neg"	Jérémy Guiter and Matthieu Giner	Henry Gifford and Baljeet Rai	31 October 2019	101
The siblings watch an old horror movie. Boy takes the movie seriously and thinks that if they say "Greb Nefual E Neg" 3 times, they are cursed. The siblings think it's lame, but when Girl says it 3 times, the siblings start to disappear.
2	2	"Pen Pals"	Jérémy Guiter and Matthieu Giner	Thomas Krajewski	19 November 2019	102
When Boy starts sending cookies to Gretchen, his pen pal, the others interfere to keep the cookies for themselves.
3	3	"The Cheesy Diary"	Jérémy Guiter and Matthieu Giner	Henry Gifford and Baljeet Rai	20 November 2019	103
Cheese uses Boy's journal to write a fantasy story, which Boy follows to make himself seem cooler.
4	4	"Game of Throne"	Jérémy Guiter and Matthieu Giner	Henry Gifford and Baljeet Rai	21 November 2019	104
Tired of having to fight for bathroom time, the boys and girls split the bathroom into two sections.
5	5	"Scoot or Be Scooted"	Jérémy Guiter and Matthieu Giner	Neil Alsip and Thomas Krajewski	22 November 2019	105
The family must train Cat to ride a scooter to help them win a race.
6	6	"Boy's Friend"	Jérémy Guiter and Matthieu Giner	Gene Laufenberg	25 November 2019	106
The family tries to find Boy a friend he can take on a canoeing trip.
7	7	"Mama'd Boy"	Jérémy Guiter and Matthieu Giner	Gene Laufenberg	26 November 2019	107
Boy is left in charge when Mom and Dad go away, but when he can't discipline his family, he gets his old babysitter to help.
8	8	"Monster Butt"	Jérémy Guiter and Matthieu Giner	Ashley Mendoza and Baljeet Rai	27 November 2019	113
Girl convinces Boy to be the bottom half of her monster costume for a convention cosplay contest.
9	9	"Cat Walkers"	Jérémy Guiter and Matthieu Giner	Augustin Mas	28 November 2019	109
Girl decides to teach Dog how to stand up for himself and say no when she sees he's being overworked by Boy.
10	10	"World Record Records"	Jérémy Guiter and Matthieu Giner	Henry Gifford and Baljeet Rai	29 November 2019	110
Mouse challenges the others to each break a world record.
11	11	"Cat Beard"	Jérémy Guiter and Matthieu Giner	Andrew Burrell	2 December 2019	111
Boy thinks having a beard will make him wiser, so Girl decides to make him one out of Cat's hair.
12	12	"Camp Champs"	Jérémy Guiter and Matthieu Giner	Ashley Mendoza and Henry Gifford	3 December 2019	112
The siblings go camping for the weekend.
13	13	"Happy Game"	Jérémy Guiter and Matthieu Giner	Ashley Mendoza and Henry Gifford	4 December 2019	108
Mouse gets a new video game to encourage his siblings to work as a team, but they can't stop bickering with each other.
14	14	"Crimes Against the Family"	Jérémy Guiter and Matthieu Giner	Anne Baraou	16 March 2020 (Note: This episode premiered on Family Channel in Canada on 14 January 2020.)	114
Mom and Dad take away the TV to punish the kids for fighting each other. They need to prove they are responsible, so Mouse takes the role of a judge and punishes the kids when they continue to make mischief.
15	15	"Scientifically Impossible"	Jérémy Guiter and Matthieu Giner	Henry Gifford and Baljeet Rai	17 March 2020	117
Girl has a science project and she needs Mouse's help, but she steals an invention from Mouse to present to her school.
16	16	"We Could Be Heroes"	Jérémy Guiter and Matthieu Giner	Reid Harrison	18 March 2020	116
Mouse accidentally saves Cheese, and the grateful Cheese does him favors as a form of thanks.
17	17	"The Dog Who Cried Wolf"	Jérémy Guiter and Matthieu Giner	Reid Harrison	19 March 2020	115
Dog is angry because his family thinks that wolves are cooler than dogs, so he joins a gang to prove that he is just as cool as any wolf.
18	18	"Confession Cat"	Jérémy Guiter and Matthieu Giner	Henry Gifford and Baljeet Rai	20 March 2020	118
Cat finds one of Mouse's inventions that gives her intelligence and speech, but she threatens to reveal all the little secrets they've been telling her.
19	19	"Imitation Games"	Jérémy Guiter and Matthieu Giner	Augustin Mas	23 March 2020	119
Dog and Cheese tease each other for what they like to do, until they end up liking the other's hobbies.
20	20	"Smoothie Operators"	Jérémy Guiter and Matthieu Giner	Reid Harrison	24 March 2020	120
When Mouse brings back an old ice cream truck, the siblings decide to start their own business, but Uncle Bob is their competitor.
21	21	"Don't Have a Cow"	Jérémy Guiter and Matthieu Giner	Henry Gifford and Baljeet Rai	25 March 2020	121
Mom and Dad bring the kids to the farm, where Cheese meets Delilah the cow and befriends her, eventually bringing her home.
22	22	"The Fantastical World of Bobbly Wobbly"	Jérémy Guiter and Matthieu Giner	Thomas Krajewski	26 March 2020	122
Having received tickets, Boy takes his siblings to a bobblehead factory, and the factory is worse than he expected, but Boy seems to be blinded by his naivety.
23	23	"It's Raining Ben"	Jérémy Guiter and Matthieu Giner	Reid Harrison	27 March 2020	123
The siblings frighten Mouse by telling the tale of the abominable Ben when a mysterious person rings the doorbell.
24	24	"The Cheese Ball"	Jérémy Guiter and Matthieu Giner	Thomas Krajewski	30 March 2020	124
Since Cheese doesn't have a birthday, she organizes a big party to happen every year, but it doesn't turn out how she expected.
25	25	"Voice Swap"	Jérémy Guiter and Matthieu Giner	Anne Baraou	31 March 2020	125
Mouse is sick of his siblings' conversations, so he decides to use an invention that causes the others to swap voices; now they can hear how irritating they sound. At first, the kids have fun with each other's voices, using them to playing tricks - but how will Boy get through school when all he can say is "meow"? Mouse will give the kids' original voices back, but only as they learn to be quieter!
26	26	"Neighborhood Watchdog"	Jérémy Guiter and Matthieu Giner	Nicolas Laquerrière and Vladimir Haulet	1 April 2020	126
Dog becomes a police dog again and his siblings go to supervise the neighborhood.
27	27	"Safety Dance"	Jérémy Guiter and Matthieu Giner	Henry Gifford and Baljeet Rai	15 June 2020	127
Boy finds that the family is not sufficiently prepared for danger, so he decides to train them.
28	28	"Breaking Bad Habits"	Jérémy Guiter and Matthieu Giner	Henry Gifford and Baljeet Rai	16 June 2020	128
The siblings try to break their bad habits by not doing them for 24 hours.
29	29	"Dog's Show"	Jérémy Guiter and Matthieu Giner	Augustin Mas	17 June 2020	129
The siblings want to register Dog in a dog show to win a meal ticket.
30	30	"Sparkcheeza"	Jérémy Guiter and Matthieu Giner	Vladimir Haulet	18 June 2020	130
Cheese wants to be a star, but no one is encouraging, valuing or giving her the recognition she deserves, so she, craving attention, fakes a fall down the stairs at the house and pretends to have unconsciousness-induced amnesia to be treated as such.
31	31	"Curling Tail"	Jérémy Guiter and Matthieu Giner	Reid Harrison	19 June 2020	131
Dog, Cat and Mouse are sick of their tails. The others are persuaded to want to wear one, so Mouse builds them.
32	32	"Boy Quits Bobbleheads"	Jérémy Guiter and Matthieu Giner	Wagner Cardeña	22 June 2020	132
Thinking he is too old to play with bobbleheads, Boy decides to give up his passion and become a "real" man.
33	33	"Perfectly Dysfunctional"	Jérémy Guiter and Matthieu Giner	Henry Gifford and Baljeet Rai	23 June 2020	133
Mouse does an experiment to create a perfect family.
34	34	"First Cheese on Mars"	Jérémy Guiter and Matthieu Giner	Sylvain Huchet	1 July 2020	134
Dog and Cheese want to go on Mars on Mouse's rocket.
35	35	"The Cat Crusader"	Jérémy Guiter and Matthieu Giner	Thomas Krajewski	24 June 2020	135
Cat is persuaded to be a superhero, but the siblings don't trust or believe in her.
36	36	"Family Photo-No"	Jérémy Guiter and Matthieu Giner	Emma Hogan	25 June 2020	136
Boy ruins the family photo. They call a photographer to take a new one, but it seems that it will be complicated.
37	37	"Putt Putt Pals"	Jérémy Guiter and Matthieu Giner	Oriane Vittu de Kerraoul	26 June 2020	137
Stevie Smith challenges Boy to a mini-golf tournament.
38	38	"Mouse Big as House"	Jérémy Guiter and Matthieu Giner	Wagner Cardeña	29 June 2020	138
Mouse is ignored by his siblings, so he decides to create an invention to make him grow and be more visible, but it backfires.
39	39	"Suit Yourself"	Jérémy Guiter and Matthieu Giner	Vladimir Haulet	30 June 2020	139
Cheese has shaved Dog's fur, so he wears an elegant suit instead, but he accidentally destroys Lady Burlington's fence.
40	40	"Family Bubble"	Jérémy Guiter and Matthieu Giner	Wagner Cardeña	16 January 2021	140
Everyone is sick except Mouse, so he builds his own bubble to avoid contacting germs, but everyone wants a bubble too.
41	41	"Whistle to the Beat"	Jérémy Guiter and Matthieu Giner	Wagner Cardeña	29 September 2020	141
Boy's nose makes a weird sound when he sleeps, but when Lila Bird captures it on video, it goes viral.
42	42	"Clickbait and Switch"	Jérémy Guiter and Matthieu Giner	Reid Harrison, Henry Gifford and Baljeet Rai	29 September 2020	142
Lila has a new vlog and becomes popular in school, so Girl creates a vlog about her family's lifestyle to compete.
43	43	"Dog Unleashed"	Jérémy Guiter and Matthieu Giner	Emma Hogan	30 September 2020	143
Wanda starts to enforce the dogs-on-leashes law, and Dog will do everything to fight this injustice.
44	44	"Color Me Dog"	Jérémy Guiter and Matthieu Giner	Henry Gifford and Baljeet Rai	3 September 2020	144
Mouse creates a machine to show Dog how amazing seeing colors is, but at the museum, he dirties the wall and makes "art".
45	45	"Living Outside the Box"	Jérémy Guiter and Matthieu Giner	Augustin Mas	2 October 2020	145
Bored, Mouse wants to do things differently and break his routine with Girl while having fun.
46	46	"Cat's Secret Life"	Jérémy Guiter and Matthieu Giner	Thomas Personeni	5 October 2020	146
Girl has a project at school and decides to do one about Cat's mysterious double life; everyone follows Cat to see what she does.
47	47	"Magic Hairball"	Jérémy Guiter and Matthieu Giner	Henry Gifford and Baljeet Rai	6 October 2020	147
Cat coughs up a hairball with mystical properties, and the other siblings decide to use it to make all their decisions for them.
48	48	"Wedgie"	Jérémy Guiter and Matthieu Giner	Thomas Krajewski	9 September 2020	148
Wedgie, Cheese's missing piece, arrives, and makes everyone smile because she is too pretty and adorable. Cheese becomes jealous of her, but soon Wedgie starts to lie and make accusations.
49	49	"Gleeb Glob"	Jérémy Guiter and Matthieu Giner	Henry Gifford and Baljeet Rai	8 October 2020	149
Mouse has a new invention that Girl "borrows": an unidentified, green, goo-like blob that is so cool that the siblings all play with it, but when they pet it, it gets dangerously bigger and threatens to engulf all of them.
50	50	"Cat Burglar"	Jérémy Guiter and Matthieu Giner	Emma Hogan	9 October 2020	150
Someone has stolen Lady Burlington's jewels, and the siblings believe that all evidence points to Cat as the thief.
51	51	"Hampered Hamster"	Jérémy Guiter and Matthieu Giner	Thomas Personeni	12 October 2020	151
Charlotte lends her pet to the siblings, but Mouse doesn't believe their neighbor's hamster should live in a cage.
52	52	"Family on Ice"	Jérémy Guiter and Matthieu Giner	Henry Gifford and Baljeet Rai	13 October 2020	152
The siblings prepare a Christmas surprise for their parents and recreate their meeting at the ice rink, but the rink is in ruins.

=== Season 2 (2022) ===
No. overall	No. in season	Title	Directed by	Written by	Original release date	Prod. code
53	1	"Begins! Part 1"	Matthieu Giner	Thomas Krajewski	3 January 2022	153
The family's backstory is revealed, as Gramps recalls how the siblings' parents almost did not get married.
54	2	"Begins! Part 2"	Matthieu Giner	Thomas Krajewski	4 January 2022	154
The story of the parents' wedding is revealed, told via flashback.
55	3	"The Pied Bagpiper"	Matthieu Giner	Gene Laufenberg	5 January 2022	155
Cheese learns to play the bagpipes, much to the dismay of the others, and attracts squirrels with its sound as a result.
56	4	"Robot-y Karate"	Matthieu Giner	Gene Laufenberg	6 January 2022	156
Sensei comes over for a visit and Dog tries giving him a retirement gift.
57	5	"Gametime, Go!"	Matthieu Giner	Davey Moore	7 January 2022	157
Boy and Girl hurt Gramps' feelings and try to make it up to him.
58	6	"Go Fetch!"	Matthieu Giner	Davey Moore	10 January 2022	158
When Dog invents a gadget that allows him to play fetch alone, Cheese is convinced it will be a runaway success, but Mouse is desperate to hold on to his place as family inventor.
59	7	"Junked"	Henry Gifford and Baljeet Rai	Davey Moore	11 January 2022	159
The kids hold a yard sale but can't bear giving away their childhood possessions, so they try to pull off a heist to retrieve it all.
60	8	"Tricked Out"	Matthieu Giner	Henry Gifford and Baljeet Rai	12 January 2022	160
Boy and Girl become rival magicians as they battle it out at Skippy's Open Mic Night.
61	9	"The Roommate"	Matthieu Giner	Ciaran Murtagh and Andrew Barnett-Jones	13 January 2022	161
Driven to distraction by her siblings, boisterous behaviour, Girl decides to move into the Grampavan. Although it seems great for Girl, her siblings realize how much they miss her.
62	10	"Chili Overload"	Matthieu Giner	Shane Perez	14 January 2022	162
The kids get a chance to run Miss Skippy's new food kiosk, where Mouse starts serving his own "perfect" chilli and adding it to everything, possibly ruining Miss Skippy's business completely.
63	11	"X Marks the Spot"	Matthieu Giner	Ciaran Murtagh and Andrew Jones	17 January 2022	163
The kids find a treasure map, causing treasure-hunting fever to descend on the family. It doesn't help that Cheese is live-streaming the whole thing, broadcasting every move.
64	12	"Lights! Camera! Action!"	Matthieu Giner	Gene Laufenberg	18 January 2022	164
The kids audition for a movie that's shooting in town, and a reluctant Cat lands the role as lead alien, but Cat would rather just go to the circus.
65	13	"Dog Days"	Matthieu Giner	Henry Gifford and Baljeet Rai	19 January 2022	165
When Dog is housebound with an injured paw, Mouse links a teddy bear to Dog's mind so that through the teddy, Dog can at least experience the great outdoors virtually.
66	14	"Narwhal Day"	Matthieu Giner	Gene Laufenberg	20 January 2022	166
The gang is ready to celebrate Narwhal Day, one of their favorite holidays. They then discover that it isn't a real holiday, just something Dad made up.
67	15	"Bobblehead Heads"	Matthieu Giner	Charles-Henri Moarbes	21 January 2022	167
When Boy's school Bobblehead Head Club is closed down due to not having enough members, his siblings help make the club more fun.
68	16	"Mouse Steps"	Matthieu Giner	Henry Gifford and Baljeet Rai	24 January 2022	168
Mouse is proud of helping the siblings solve their problems using 'mouse steps'. In fact, he is so proud that he becomes obsessed with helping Girl solve her mysterious problem too.
69	17	"Gramps' Gauntlet of Greatness"	Matthieu Giner	Henry Gifford and Baljeet Rai	25 January 2022	169
The kids want to impress Gramps by completing the Gauntlet of Greatness carnival attraction that he had done when he was their age. Girl and Dog however just can't seem to beat it.
70	18	"Who Let the Weredogs Out?"	Matthieu Giner	Henry Gifford and Baljeet Rai	26 January 2022	170
When Cheese tells Boy he has been the victim of a weredog staredown, he becomes convinced he will turn into a weredog too.
71	19	"Staycation"	Matthieu Giner	Ciaran Murtagh and Andrew Jones	27 January 2022	171
Cheese wins an invitation to a movie premiere which happens to coincide with the annual family vacation. She lies so that the family doesn't have to go on vacation by saying she has charity work to do instead.
72	20	"The Swapper"	Matthieu Giner	Gene Laufenberg	28 January 2022	172
Mouse's latest experiment goes horribly wrong when he swaps brains with a house fly. With his sibling's help, Mouse frantically tries reversing the wacky situation.
73	21	"Nothing but the Truth"	Matthieu Giner	Gene Laufenberg	31 January 2022	173
Boy is afraid of being honest in case he hurts other people's feelings and finds himself doing things he doesn't like just to keep others happy. Mouse and Cheese encourage him to be totally honest, only to find that Boy's total honesty can be rather blunt. The gang must rein him in before Boy alienates the entire town.
74	22	"Gramp's Date"	Matthieu Giner	Gene Laufenberg	1 February 2022	174
Much to the kids' horror, Gramps starts spending a lot of time with mean Miss Molly, so the gang do whatever it takes to keep the two apart.
75	23	"For the Birds"	Matthieu Giner	Ciaran Murtagh and Andrew Barnett-Jones	2 February 2022	175
Boy gets his dream job at the collectables store, but when a family of screeching birds makes the store entrance their home, the customers stay away.
76	24	"Future Proof"	Matthieu Giner	Henry Gifford and Baljeet Rai	3 February 2022	176
The kids wonder what they will be when they grow up. Mouse's enhanced online career quiz leads Boy to think he is destined to be an astronaut, with Girl thinking she will end up a safety inspector.
77	25	"Grin and Parrot"	Matthieu Giner	Gene Laufenberg	4 February 2022	177
Boy and Dog are working on their comedy act for a talent show, but nobody finds them funny, until they find a runaway parrot who laughs hysterically at them 24/7.
78	26	"The Favour"	Matthieu Giner	Gene Laufenberg	20 June 2022	178
A photographer is coming to take photos of Girl's latest cosplay creation. She needs the others' help building it and agrees to do a series of favors for them in return.
79	27	"Hide Me If You Can"	Matthieu Giner	Charles-Henri Moarbes	20 June 2022	179
The annual town-wide hide-and-seek contest is here. The family always hide together, but Girl points out that Boy is terrible at hiding and is bound to cause them to lose.
80	28	"L.A.R.P. Out Loud"	Matthieu Giner	Henry Gifford and Baljeet Rai	20 June 2022	180
When their parents clear out the attic, the siblings compete to claim it for their own private bedroom in an epic play-battle saga based on Cheese's medieval fantasy story.
81	29	"Arcade Aid"	Matthieu Giner	Gene Laufenberg	20 June 2022	181
Cat becomes obsessed with winning a soft toy elephant at the arcade, but the greedy Smith twins are playing the games meant for little kids and winning every single prize.
82	30	"Family Fun Fight"	Matthieu Giner	Henry Gifford and Baljeet Rai	20 June 2022	182
When the kids convince Mom and Dad to take part in a family-friendly TV game show, they unwittingly kick-start an over-the-top rivalry which threatens family peace.
83	31	"Grow Your Own"	Matthieu Giner	Ciaran Murtagh and Andrew Barnett-Jones	27 June 2022	183
The kids visit an eco-camp to learn how to grow vegetables, but the Smith twins are also there and have no intention of pulling their weight.
84	32	"Two Great Kids"	Matthieu Giner	Charles-Henri Moarbes	27 June 2022	184
When Boy and Girl start receiving lavish gifts addressed to 'two great kids', Mouse thinks it must be a mistake. He and Dog set out to investigate.
85	33	"FOMO No Mo"	Matthieu Giner	Gene Laufenberg	27 June 2022	185
Boy and Girl discover that while they're at school, the others are home doing all kinds of fun things, leading to a serious case of FOMO.
86	34	"Tucked In"	Matthieu Giner	Baljeet Rai	27 June 2022	186
Boy has planned a perfect sleepover with best friend Tuck that will feature bobblehead-themed activities. Boy them gets jealous when Tuck keeps getting distracted by his siblings' antics.
87	35	"The Heated Smell of Friendship"	Matthieu Giner	Charles-Henri Moarbes	27 June 2022	187
When a horrible smell ruins everyone's day at the beach, Cheese mistakenly believes she is growing stinky and is too embarrassed to go out.
88	36	"Road Trip"	Matthieu Giner	Gene Laufenberg	4 July 2022	188
Gramps is going to visit his old friend Zeus at their favourite childhood theme park, and the gang tags along for the ride. However, while getting there is half the fun, the kids' antics cause the van to break down! Can they work together to get Gramps to his friend before the park closes forever?
89	37	"The Hosts"	Matthieu Giner	Ciaran Murtagh and Andrew Barnett-Jones	5 July 2022	189
When the Smith Twins cause Mouse's smell-making machine to backfire, the kids have to leave their stinky house for the night.
90	38	"The Cat Crusader Returns!"	Matthieu Giner	Gene Laufenberg	6 July 2022	190
Cat becomes superhero Cat Crusader again, but a jealous Gherkin frames her into looking like a bad cat rather than a hero.
91	39	"Cat's Frenemy"	Matthieu Giner	Charles-Henri Moarbes	7 July 2022	191
Mrs. Rodriguez's cat Mr. Boots becomes friends with Cat and comes over to the house to play a lot.
92	40	"DJ Cat-Cat"	Matthieu Giner	Baljeet Rai	1 August 2022	192
Girl and Cheese choose Cat to DJ the family's upcoming party, but Boy, Dog and Mouse think Cat will become the focus of the party that's supposed to be for all of them.
93	41	"No Mail's Land"	Matthieu Giner	Baljeet Rai	2 August 2022	193
When Dog's rivalry with the mail woman comes to a head, she goes on leave - which means none of the siblings will get the important packages they ordered.
94	42	"Girl's Greatness"	Matthieu Giner	Charles-Henri Moarbes	3 August 2022	194
Girl hears that Lila secretly thinks she is great and tries to get her to admit it.
95	43	"Fix It Yourself"	Matthieu Giner	Louisa Ourrad	4 August 2022	195
The kids start upcycling broken items for people in town, but things go wrong when Cheese focuses on making things look cool rather than fixing them.
96	44	"Goodbye Gramps"	Matthieu Giner	Gene Laufenberg	5 August 2022	196
Gramps gets an offer to leave town for a whole year to go on an adventurous trek, but the kids will miss him and try to convince him to stay.
97	45	"Picture Perfect"	Matthieu Giner	Ciaran Murtagh and Andrew Barnett-Jones	8 August 2022	197
When Doozie Smoothies wants to find a face to advertise their new range, Cheese is keen to enter the photo competition, with Dog's help as photographer.
98	46	"The Cool List"	Matthieu Giner	Louisa Ourrad	9 August 2022	198
When Cheese realizes she hasn't done half of what her idol, Posh Daintybottom, has accomplished, she tries to catch up by imitating everything Posh does, but things go very wrong.
99	47	"Founder's Play"	Matthieu Giner	Wagner Cardeña	10 August 2022	199
When Adeline quits the annual town founders' play due to artistic differences, Cheese is hired as director. The family is happy to help, but Cheese soon turns super-bossy.
100	48	"Pastime Paradise"	Matthieu Giner	Louise Ourrad	11 August 2022	200
Gramps tells the kids about a heavenly clearing in the woods, and they decide to make it their hang-out spot for the summer. The Smith twins also find out about it.
101	49	"Mighty Fighty Robots"	Matthieu Giner	Wagner Cardeña	12 August 2022	201
The gang want to win theme park tickets that are up for grabs in a robot fighting contest. They ask to use Mouse's unbeatable robot, but he prefers to help them build their own.
102	50	"No Boys Allowed"	Matthieu Giner	Gene Laufenberg	15 August 2022	202
Mom and the girls have an annual day where they do a bunch of fun stuff together, but this year, Mom invites the boys and Dad to join them too.
103	51	"The Spy Who Bugged Me"	Matthieu Giner	Augustin Mas	16 August 2022	203
The kids are excited about attending spy camp. Their trainer however is a bit of a dud, and the siblings are disappointed not to learn anything.
104	52	"Video Game Pain"	Matthieu Giner	Louisa Ourrad	17 August 2022	204
Margaret the CEO buys Jocko's old amusement arcade and vows to tear it down, but Boy loves the arcade and challenges her to an epic video game battle with the fate of the arcade at stake. The episode ends with Boy using a cheat code to win.

=== Season 3 (2023–24) ===
No. overall	No. in season	Title	Directed by	Written by	Original release date	Prod. code
105	1	"K-Jam's Welcome Party"	Ophélie Mahé and Mireille Tram	Gene Laufenberg	20 November 2023	205
K-Jam is moving into the neighbourhood and staying with the family for a while, but Girl gets insecure and thinks that her awesome best friend is trying to take her place.
106	2	"Best Best Friends"	Ophélie Mahé and Mireille Tram	Ciaran Murtagh and Andrew Barnett Jones	21 November 2023	206
Boy and Girl have a contest to see whose best friend is the best of the best, but after taking it too far, they are in danger of losing Tucker and K-Jam forever.
107	3	"Fairy Cheese Mother"	Ophélie Mahé and Mireille Tram	Gene Laufenberg	22 November 2023	207
To prove she can be selfless, Cheese begins granting wishes. When Lila Bird shows up to do the same, Cheese loses sight of her goal as she tries to remain number one.
108	4	"Yeah Baby!"	Ophélie Mahé and Mireille Tram	Ciaran Murtagh and Andrew Barnett Jones	23 November 2023	208
When the kids think that Mom may be pregnant, they set out to prove they will be great babysitters. Along the way, they learn that it's harder to do it alone than it is together.
109	5	"Fired Up"	Ophélie Mahé and Mireille Tram	Baljeet Rai and Henry Gifford	24 November 2023	209
When Girl gets the chance to put together the school fair, her friends and family jump at the chance to help, until she gets advice from Margaret, a hardened businesswoman.
110	6	"Finding Gretchen"	Ophélie Mahé and Mireille Tram	Ciaran Murtagh and Andrew Barnett Jones	27 November 2023	210
Boy finally meets his penpal, Gretchen, in person, but she is nothing like she described herself in their letters. Something is off, and Boy wants to get to the bottom of it.
111	7	"Pool Party Crashers"	Ophélie Mahé and Mireille Tram	Gene Laufenberg	28 November 2023	211
Dog has been hired as a security guard at the new community pool. When the kids discover the long line at the pool, they try to convince Dog to break the rules and let them in.
112	8	"The Incredible Boy Pretzel"	Ophélie Mahé and Mireille Tram	Henry Gifford and Baljeet Rai	29 November 2023	212
When Ripped Ab-Man asks Boy to help him win a game show, his siblings worry that he is being taken advantage of and decide to investigate.
113	9	"Multi-Mouse"	Ophélie Mahé and Mireille Tram	Henry Gifford and Baljeet Rai	30 November 2023	213
When Mouse feels left out of family activities, he searches the multiverse for an alternative family to spend time with.
114	10	"Gramps vs. Mom"	Ophélie Mahé and Mireille Tram	Gene Laufenberg	1 December 2023	214
Mom is worried that Gramps's daring lifestyle could end up hurting him, so she asks the kids to show him how to be safe by acting his age, which just bores thrill-seeking Gramps.
115	11	"Clubhouse Brothers"	Ophélie Mahé and Mireille Tram	Gene Laufenberg	4 December 2023	215
Boy and Tuck offer to build a clubhouse for Cat and Charlotte, but the two boys have a hard time letting go of their wonderful creation, driving the two girls up the wall.
116	12	"Project Gherkin"	Ophélie Mahé and Mireille Tram	Gene Laufenberg	5 December 2023	216
When Girl and K-Jam find Gherkin crying because nobody likes him, he confesses to them that he wants to change and become nicer. After asking the girls to help teach him how to be nice, the girls reluctantly agree and recruit Girl's siblings to help.
117	13	"Image Problems"	Ophélie Mahé and Mireille Tram	Gene Laufenberg	6 December 2023	217
Mouse discovers that Dog is able to make a sad puppy dog face that allows him to get whatever he wants. When Mouse asks Dog to use this trick to get the Professor to loan him a rare, special rock for his experiment, Dog refuses. To get his own back, Mouse uses a special invention that allows him to impersonate Dog and get the rock.
118	14	"The Fangirl"	Ophélie Mahé and Mireille Tram	Alex Chereau	5 February 2024	218
When Girl's football skills catch the attention of a little girl named Bella, she declares herself Girl's number one fan, but being a fan is more work than she thought.
119	15	"No Way Vay Cay"	Ophélie Mahé and Mireille Tram	Ciaran Murtagh and Andrew Barnett Jones	6 February 2024	219
When Mom and Dad's vacation plans get cancelled, they decide to take the whole family on a getaway to wherever they'd like. The kids decide to vote on where to go, but Cheese deceives her family and tricks them into going to a spa instead of the theme park they originally wanted to go to. After realizing how selfish she's been, Cheese decides it's up to her to save what's left of the family vacation.
120	16	"The Pickle Prince"	Ophélie Mahé and Mireille Tram	Peter Saisselin	7 February 2024	220
Every year, Boy enters and wins the Pickle Prince competition. However, when Dog is convinced to enter the contest to give Boy some competition, a feud erupts between the two.
121	17	"Doggie Bagged"	Ophélie Mahé and Mireille Tram	Gene Laufenberg	8 February 2024	221
After causing a ruckus at the Town Fair, Dog asks his old sensei to train him to be calmer, but Dog's new peaceful attitude might be even worse.
122	18	"Cat-bert Einstein"	Ophélie Mahé and Mireille Tram	Louisa Ourrad and Wagner Cardeña	9 February 2024	222
After Mouse underestimates Cat, she figures out how to make his time machine work. After getting stranded in prehistoric times, they have to figure out how to get back home.
123	19	"The Alien"	Ophélie Mahé and Mireille Tram	Mathilde Cadrot	12 February 2024	223
After Cheese hears that the town has been invaded by an alien, the kids decide to investigate. Girl is skeptical until she starts believing that she is turning into an alien.
124	20	"Paradise Grove Lost"	Ophélie Mahé and Mireille Tram	Lucie Trémolières	13 February 2024	224
The kids are horrified to discover that their favourite spot, Paradise Grove, has been polluted by the Bobblehead Factory.
125	21	"Strictly Professional"	Ophélie Mahé and Mireille Tram	Omotunde Akiode	14 February 2024	225
When Boy's best friend, Tuck, is told he may have to go summer school, Boy agrees to tutor him, but tutoring Tuck is much more difficult than Boy expected.
126	22	"Spoiler Alert"	Ophélie Mahé and Mireille Tram	Gene Laufenberg	15 February 2024	226
In order to avoid him spoiling the new Captain Callisto movie, the siblings have to be Gherkin's servants for a week.
127	23	"The Pen"	Ophélie Mahé and Mireille Tram	Omotunde Akiode and Gene Laufenberg	16 February 2024	227
Dog and Cat enjoy a collar-free lifestyle, until an animal-control officer thinks they are strays. Together, they must escape the only place worse than the vet - the pound.
128	24	"Big Break"	Ophélie Mahé and Mireille Tram	Louisa Ourrad and Wagner Cardeña	19 February 2024	228
When Cheese is disappointed by the role she was cast in for her favourite soap opera, she takes matters into her own hands to get a bigger role.
129	25	"Mildred the Bobblehead"	Ophélie Mahé and Mireille Tram	Mathilde Cadrot	20 February 2024	229
Boy is ecstatic to find Mildred - the rarest Bobblehead on earth - in a bin. Soon, Mildred becomes an unhealthy obsession for Boy, and it's up to his siblings to intervene.
130	26	"Paperback Mountain"	Ophélie Mahé and Mireille Tram	Jean Méranger-Galtier	22 July 2024	230
In order for Boy to fulfill his dream of becoming a Chosen Librarian, he and his siblings must complete the task of recovering a long-lost, overdue library book.
131	27	"The Cat Crusader III"	Ophélie Mahé and Mireille Tram	Mathilde Cadrot	23 July 2024	231
Exhausted by all her superhero work, Cat asks Mr. Boots to be her sidekick. However, Cat gets jealous when it turns out that Mr. Boots is better at being a superhero than her.
132	28	"A Couple of Dummies"	Ophélie Mahé and Mireille Tram	Gene Laufenberg	24 July 2024	232
Dad takes up ventriloquism as a hobby. The kids must find a way to stop Dad from embarrassing himself as he tries to showcase his new talent around town.
133	29	"Tech Detox"	Ophélie Mahé and Mireille Tram	Wagner Cardeña	25 July 2024	233
After one of Mouse's inventions accidentally hurts Cat, the kids convince Mouse to go to Farmer Joe's Tech Detox camp to learn how to function without technology.
134	30	"Old Lady of Awesomeness"	Ophélie Mahé and Mireille Tram	Mélissa Demongeot and Gene Laufenberg	26 July 2024	234
After losing a bet, Mouse and Cheese are forced to spend time with Old Lady McGuire. Their annoyance fades when they realise that they have her huge game room all to themselves!
135	31	"The Cookie Squad"	Ophélie Mahé and Mireille Tram	Wagner Cardeña	29 July 2024	235
After breaking their game console, the kids decide to sell Boy's homemade cookies to raise money for a new one. All is well until they get some unexpected competition!
136	32	"Skate Mates"	Ophélie Mahé and Mireille Tram	Mélissa Demongeot and Gene Laufenberg	30 July 2024	236
Dog and Susie set aside their differences to partner up for a figure-skating competition. All is well until they realise that someone is sabotaging them and their chances of winning!
137	33	"The Rise of Lila Bird"	Ophélie Mahé and Mireille Tram	Alex Chereau	31 July 2024	237
Lila becomes a sci-fi fan and asks Girl to help keep it a secret. Girl helps by making a costume to help hide her while at the sci-fi convention - what could go wrong?
138	34	"Cheese, Her Story"	Ophélie Mahé and Mireille Tram	Gene Laufenberg	1 August 2024	238
Cheese's short stories get published in the local newspaper. The only problem is that the details of the stories were "borrowed" from her siblings' day-to-day lives!
139	35	"The Flower Incident"	Ophélie Mahé and Mireille Tram	Jean Méranger-Galtier	2 August 2024	239
After accidentally destroying Ms Rodriguez's flowers, Girl enlists her siblings to help her cover up the accident.
140	36	"No Paint, No Gain"	Ophélie Mahé and Mireille Tram	Gene Laufenberg	5 August 2024	240
When Lady Burlington needs her official portrait painted, the siblings convince her that Dog is the artist for the job. What starts as a fun art project soon becomes a nightmare!
141	37	"Play It Cool"	Ophélie Mahé and Mireille Tram	Mathilde Cadrot	6 August 2024	241
Noticing that Boy has been distant lately, Dog asks Cheese for advice. However, the advice she gives pushes Boy and Dog further apart!
142	38	"Hot Tip"	Ophélie Mahé and Mireille Tram	Gene Laufenberg	7 August 2024	242
It's time for the First Day of Summer Festival, and Cheese is ready to perform for the whole town. However, she is so excited that she refuses to listen to warnings about an imminent heatwave.
143	39	"House of Lies"	Ophélie Mahé and Mireille Tram	Lucie Trémolières and Alex Chereau	8 August 2024	243
The town has always revered the Smith twins' great-great-grandpa as a local hero. However, when the gang exposes him as a fraud, they need to find a way to cheer the twins up.
144	40	"Child's Play"	Ophélie Mahé and Mireille Tram	Ciaran Murtagh and Andrew Barnett Jones	4 November 2024	244
Girl, Dog, and Cheese start a babysitting business, but their first client is a real handful! If they want to please him, they might just need to take Boy's advice.
145	41	"Bug Buddies"	Ophélie Mahé and Mireille Tram	Jean Meranger-Galtier	5 November 2024	245
Dog finds out he has fleas! But when he befriends them, he must hide them from his family to prevent them from getting zapped.
146	42	"Cheese's Crummy Christmas"	Ophélie Mahé and Mireille Tram	Lisa Gaultier	6 November 2024	246
To celebrate Christmas, Mom and Dad suggest that the siblings make each other gifts. When Dog is assigned to give a gift to Cheese, Cheese sneaks to find out what the gift is.
147	43	"Queen of Justice"	Ophélie Mahé and Mireille Tram	Mathilde Cadrot	7 November 2024	247
After discovering that she's a great 'professional protester', Cheese uses her newfound talent for personal gain.
148	44	"Girl's Secret Fear"	Ophélie Mahé and Mireille Tram	Lucie Tremolieres	8 November 2024	248
Girl is the only one of her siblings who has absolutely no fear of anything - that is, until she is introduced to the horrors of pizza dough!
149	45	"Cat's Imaginary Friend"	Ophélie Mahé and Mireille Tram	Gene Laufenberg	11 November 2024	249
Girl gives Cat her old favourite toy. Cat loves the toy until Girl starts insisting that Cat is not playing with it the right way.
150	46	"The Big Betrayal"	Ophélie Mahé and Mireille Tram	Jean Meranger-Galtier	12 November 2024	250
Tired of feeling like a loser, Mouse decides to play dirty to win Mazes and Monsters against his siblings, even if it means it takes away the fun of the game for everyone.
151	47	"No Cheese Please"	Ophélie Mahé and Mireille Tram	Mathilde Cadrot	13 November 2024	251
K-Jam and Girl have plans for their playdate! However, when Cheese shoves herself in and takes over, she jeopardizes all of their plans!
152	48	"Home Schooled"	Ophélie Mahé and Mireille Tram	Gene Laufenberg	14 November 2024	252
When the siblings grow jealous of Boy and Girl going to school, Mouse offers to become their homeschool teacher. Too bad Dog, Cat, and Cheese aren't exactly model students.
153	49	"Silent Treatment"	Ophélie Mahé and Mireille Tram	Gene Laufenberg	15 November 2024	253
The kids' favourite aunt Stella is coming to visit, but a petty squabble between Boy and Cheese puts the family's upcoming fun times in danger!
154	50	"What's Your Game?"	Ophélie Mahé and Mireille Tram	Alex Chereau	18 November 2024	254
The kids scheme to borrow an unreleased video game.
155	51	"Cheese's Big Breakout"	Ophélie Mahé and Mireille Tram	Mathilde Cadrot	19 November 2024	255
After Cat and Cheese are mistaken for young kids at the hotel daycare, they are forced into the baby play area. Refusing to be stuck there, Cheese plots to escape!
156	52	"Monkeying Around"	Ophélie Mahé and Mireille Tram	Baljeet Rai	20 November 2024	256
The kids gatecrash their parents' anniversary holiday.
