= Where's My Cow? =

2005 children's book by Terry Pratchett

- Author: Terry Pratchett
- Illustrator: Melvyn Grant
- Language: English
- Series: Discworld; Illustrated children's book
- Subject: picture books Characters Samuel Vimes, Young Sam Locations Ankh-Morpork
- Genre: Fantasy
- Publisher: Doubleday / HarperCollins
- Publication date: 2005
- Awards: The Ankh-Morpork Librarians' Award
- ISBN: 0-385-60937-X

Where's My Cow? is a picture book written by Terry Pratchett and illustrated by Melvyn Grant. It is based on a book that features in Pratchett's Discworld novel Thud!, in which Samuel Vimes reads it to his son.

Where's My Cow? was released on 23 September 2005, to coincide with Thud!. The cover bears a gold sticker reading "OOK! The Ankh-Morpork Librarians' Award - Children's Winner". This looks slightly similar to the Carnegie Medal sticker on the paperback of The Amazing Maurice and his Educated Rodents. The book is a pop culture reference to the similarly named That's Not My series produced by Usborne books.

== Plot ==
The book is written as a children's picture book and tells the story of Sam Vimes reading the picture book Where's My Cow? to Young Sam. The book describes the search for a cow, in which various animals that are not cows are identified by the noise they make.

Sam eventually decides that this is a daft way to look for a cow, and that Young Sam should, in any case, be getting taught about Ankh-Morpork rather than animals he will only see on a plate. He therefore attempts to rework the story into what he calls the 'Vimes street version', about a search for "daddy" through the city, encountering such characters as Cut-Me-Own-Throat Dibbler, Foul Ole Ron, and the Patrician.

In Thud! we learn that the next day Young Sam said "Buglit!" (an attempt at Ron's distinctive "Buggrit!") and Sybil pointedly never raised the subject. Sam then stuck rigidly to the authorized version. In the framing story of Where's My Cow?, Young Sam also says "Buglit!" when Sybil comes upstairs to see what all the excitement is.

There are three art styles in the book, all drawn by Melvyn Grant. The first art style is a fairly realistic style, with a slight cartoony feel. This is used for Vimes relating the story to Young Sam. The second style is that of the book within the book, which is simple, with thick lines and pastel colours. The pictures of Vimes and Young Sam are in front of these pictures, and do not interact with them.

The third style occurs when Vimes starts changing the story. The Discworld characters are drawn in the same style as Vimes and Young Sam, but the pastel animals are still present, and all three settings (the world of Where's My Cow?, the streets of Ankh-Morpork, and Young Sam's nursery) begin blurring together. The objects in Young Sam's nursery also become animated. This quite possibly represents Young Sam's imagination.

The illustration of the nursery contains an Easter egg a painting of the author himself, Terry Pratchett. Also of note is that the various other animals, which are mistaken for cows, are drawn in such a way that their outlines, combined with their surroundings, forms a cow shape. For example, the sheep has a tree's branches for horns and a rabbit chewing greenery for an udder, the horse has a pitchfork for horns and a chicken for an udder, etc.

In this book Vimes bears a passing resemblance to actor Pete Postlethwaite. Pratchett has previously commented that this is who he has always perceived Vimes as looking like, rather than Paul Kidby's 'Clint Eastwood' representation.

The book has played a cameo at the end of Wintersmith, being read by the character Rob Anybody.
