= Lord Vetinari =

Character in Terry Pratchett's Discworld novels

- Discworld character
- Lord Vetinari, as depicted by Paul Kidby in The Pratchett Portfolio
- First appearance: The Colour of Magic
- Last appearance: Raising Steam (2015)
- Created by: Terry Pratchett
- Portrayed by: Charles Dance; Anna Chancellor; Jeremy Irons
- Voiced by: Crawford Logan; Rob Brydon

In-universe information
- Title: Patrician of Ankh-Morpork

Lord Havelock Vetinari (/ˈhævlɒk vɛtɪˈnɑːriː/, HAV-lock vet-in-NAHR-ee), Lord Patrician (Primus inter pares) of the city-state of Ankh-Morpork, is a fictional character in Terry Pratchett's Discworld series. A calculating, cool-headed leader, his design inspirations include Italian statesman and diplomat Niccolò Machiavelli, including writing a similarly-named dissertation called The Servant.

== Fictional biography ==
=== Early years ===
Lord Vetinari was born into the extremely powerful Vetinari family (a pun on the real-life family of the Medici and on the word "veterinary") and raised by his aunt, Lady Roberta Meserole. As a youth, he enrolled in the Assassins' Guild which, apart from teaching its students how to kill other people for money, also gives them an excellent academic education. Because of the similarity his name bore to "veterinary", he endured the nickname of Dog-botherer (cf. god-botherer). Vetinari graduated from the Guild with exceptional marks, scoring disconcertingly high in attention to detail. It is also mentioned that he studied languages; in Jingo he translates Klatchian for Sergeant Colon, although he flatly denies being able to speak it.

In his late teens, Vetinari was involved in the "Glorious 25th of May" (Night Watch), to which his most notable contribution was the (technical) assassination of the then-Patrician of Ankh-Morpork, Homicidal Lord Winder, though the latter ended up dying of fright rather than the planned, direct assassination. When asked (as was traditional) about who he is and who sent him, Vetinari replies, respectively, "Think of me as ... your future" and "I come from the city" showing that he already has the concern for the city's welfare he later shows. Later, Vetinari fought alongside the remnants of the Night Watch commanded by a time-traveling Samuel Vimes (who had been impersonating Sergeant-at-Arms John Keel); The entire experience clearly shape Vetinari's (and by extension, Vimes') views on the effective way of running the city.

Vetinari later journeyed to Überwald on what is known as the Grand Sneer where met the vampire Lady Margolotta. It is implied that the two had some kind of relationship, and stated more clearly that he taught her a lot of what she knows, and vice versa. It was also there that he learnt about the nature of evil after witnessing a mother otter and its pups feeding on a salmon and its roes (Unseen Academicals).

=== Rise to power ===
Vetinari is the archetype of a benevolent dictator. He is chilly and inscrutable, avoiding (apparent) direct intervention until needed or not abusing power for petty personal grievances, despite having the means to do so. The sole reason for his ruling the city is that he is fiercely loyal to it, although it has also at times been implied that he does it because it amuses him to do so, in the sense that he enjoys outwitting all the people who try to oppose him. He also has no exploitable vices, barring a strange fondness for candied jellyfish – ambiguously mentioned in the early books and thus believed by some readers to be referring to a previous Patrician - and a humorous hatred of street mimes.

Lord Vetinari succeeded Mad Lord Snapcase, who had been as mad as the name suggests. One of Vetinari's earliest actions and a sample of his way of running the city was to legalize squabbling Guilds such as those of the Thieves and the "Seamstresses", with the caveat this put them under the scrutiny of a governing body which now knew everything about them. Therefore, the Guilds typically follow his well-researched, more direct "suggestions". Lord Vetinari's political philosophy can be summed up by his belief that what people wish for most is not good government, or even justice, but merely for things to stay the same (Vetinari's family motto translating to "If it ain't broke, don't fix it"); Vetinari has an interest in keeping things in smooth, simple working order and does not destroy or remove things unnecessarily, such as seemingly frivolous but harmless ancient government departments or the palace gardens. This does not mean that there are absolutely no changes; things that don't work are fixed very quickly, even if it does not look like they are at first. He allowed the emergence of a free press and the Night Watch to form a guild, reserving judgement until later. He prefers to cow people into doing his bidding with persuasive arguments, and has rarely (if ever) been known to have innocent people just dragged off to dungeons without a trial (beyond the running joke of an intense hatred of mime artists, which is treated as a relatively mild quirk in-universe).

Morporkians are in no doubt that Vetinari is firmly in charge of the city; the political system of Ankh-Morpork is described as "One Man, One Vote," in which Vetinari alone is the Man, and he has the Vote. Despite this, his skill at judging and predicting people's behavior (e.g., Moist von Lipwig or Samuel Vimes) means he often lets events play out under detached supervision, giving him a degree of plausible deniability if ever confronted. However, he is genuinely, broadly tolerant of individual rights unless said people place their own interests above those of the city. In Going Postal, an already suspicious Vetinari nonetheless avoids an investigation of the Grand Trunk company until public opinion allowed it, and only then did he proclaim his right as a "tyrant" to launch such an inquiry. Similarly in Making Money, he declines meddling in the affairs of private business, but suddenly exercises his executive power in closing several prominent banks for audit at the end of the novel. Beyond this, he arranges for useful but problematical people to "vanish" in one fashion or another (such as the pseudo-incarceration of genius Leonard of Quirm, the charismatic confidence trickster Moist von Lipwig, or skilled forger Owlswick Jenkins) only to be press-ganged into working for himself and the city, though such options technically include the option to refuse, though to likely negative results.

In Thud!, his rule of the city is likened to a room full of tension, with people bickering and shouting at one another, and "in the middle of it all, one man, quietly doing his own thing". While not necessarily more popular than those who came before him (with a few genuine allies such as Carrot Ironfoundersson and Samuel Vimes) Lord Vetinari has maintained sound mind and judgment and thus stayed alive. He has achieved this by understanding most of his direct enemies and power-wielding opponents dislike each other even more, and arranges matters so that a reality which includes him as Patrician is slightly better than one which does not. There is general acknowledgement that very little goes on in the city that Vetinari does not know about. Thus, when a visitor stands in audience with the Patrician, they can be assured that Vetinari knows exactly why they're there, even if the visitor does not. Vetinari is even implied to organize grassroots resistance to himself, enabling him to ensure that all plots against him fail and that the various groups are constantly quarrelling with each other. This approach has been so effective he is one of the few people excluded from potential targeting from the Assassins' Guild out of concern for the resulting political chaos. Other reasons for the Patrician's continued rule include his mastery of diplomacy and manipulation, his distant and menacing air, his ever-present calmness and composure (which, ironically, make other people ill at ease), and his skills as an Assassin; in The Truth, another character relates that "Vetinari moved like a snake". Despite publicly denying their existence, Vetinari also uses a of team of information-gathering 'Dark Clerks', whose myriad jobs include accounting, forensic auditing, and domestic intelligence. It was established in Guards!, Guards! that Vetinari can communicate with the palace rats (granted accidental sentience from Unseen University's magical rubbish), who are loyal to him after being given conflict advice allowing them to become the dominant vermin of the palace.

==== Deposition and restoration ====
Several attempts have been made on Vetinari's life or position; strangely enough, he seems to be involved or predicted them in advance. Shortly after his ascent to office, he was briefly turned into a lizard by a wizard under the influence of a Sourcerer. He was deposed for a time in favor of a pretender king and subsequently a summoned dragon (Guards! Guards!) and locked up in his own dungeons which were secretly designed to allow for escape at his leisure for just such an occasion. Nonetheless, he did not avoid a permanent injury during a botched assassination attempt in Men at Arms that forces him to use a cane; In Making Money he flatly denies the circulating rumor the cane held a sword made of iron collected from the blood of a thousand men, sarcastically pointing out to Moist how melodramatic and out of character that would be. He would later initially fall victim to an arsenic-poisoning plot in (Feet of Clay) but fakes subsequent symptoms, partially to demonstrate to the perpetrators the consequences of his deposing him including incurring the dogged wrath of Commander Vimes.

During the brief war with Klatch (Jingo), Vetinari unexpectedly surrenders to martial law and is put on trial for treason; his secret excursion throughout the story created a scenario where the Klatchian leader would organically lose face and position amongst his own people. Some time later (The Truth) Vetinari is framed for assault (on his secretary) and theft from the city treasury and once again comes within a hair's breadth from being deposed. He is arrested by his own Commander of the Watch (Samuel Vimes) for attempted murder and spends part of the book incarcerated, with William de Worde and Vimes finding the crime extremely suspicious (if only because any genuine attempt at murder by the Patrician would undoubtedly succeed) and using the arrest simply as a way to keep Vetinari safe until the actual mystery was solved). Vetinari feigns unconsciousness throughout the main events, only to "come to" once the mystery was solved.

=== Notable events during Vetinari's rule ===
Vetinari has seen Ankh-Morpork through many unusual events, including the appearance of a Sourcerer (Sourcery), a dragon (Guards! Guards!), a near-civil war (Men at Arms), plus one actual war (Jingo) and an attempt to destroy the Discworld (The Last Hero), as well as the metaphysical crises of Moving Pictures, Music With Rocks In (Soul Music), superfluous life force and belief (Reaper Man, Hogfather), and one major temporal shatter (Thief of Time). It is unclear whether even the well-informed Vetinari was aware of the last.

Vetinari has encouraged the growth of the Guilds and public services. The Ankh-Morpork City Watch in particular has flourished, and is an excellent example of the adaptability which has kept Vetinari in office. At the time he rises to power, the Night Watch consists of three incompetents led by a drunk, just how he then wanted it (incapable of fighting crime, which was being efficiently controlled by the government-approved Thieves and Assassins Guilds). The group evolves into a large, efficient, well-oiled machine that facilitates the smooth operation of the city, and that appears to be just how he wants it. It is observed to him on one occasion that if Vimes (and presumably Vimes' Guards) did not exist, he would have had to invent him; to which he responds "You know, ... I rather think I did" (Feet of Clay).

Ankh-Morpork has given birth to the first newspaper, the Ankh-Morpork Times (The Truth), while the Grand Trunk Clacks Company established the first efficient international communication service from its headquarters there (The Fifth Elephant). More recently, he has put into place Moist von Lipwig, who revamps the postal service without costing the taxpayers anything (Going Postal). During this, he invents stamps, which are the closest thing Ankh-Morpork had to banknotes until said form of currency makes its debut in Making Money (again by von Lipwig). At some point between Thud! and Making Money, Vetinari begins planning for a phenomenal redevelopment project of Ankh Morpork titled "The Undertaking" – this seems to have been inspired by the discovery in Thud! of an ancient perpetual motion engine – a twin of one which according to Carrot Ironfoundersson powers all of the machinery in one of the largest mines in Uberwald. Rumours around the Undertaking include mention of "underground streets", "waterproof tunnels" and "new docks".

== Appearance, habits and miscellaneous ==
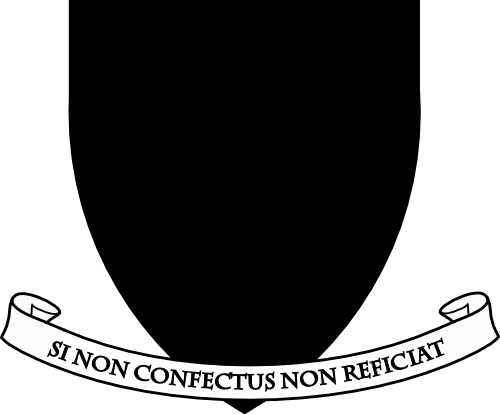
Vetinari coat of arms. It is simply a field sable, with motto si non confectus, non reficiat, "if it ain't broke, don't fix it."

Currently in his late forties/early fifties (Sam Vimes noted in Feet of Clay that the Patrician was about the same age as he was, and it is shown in Night Watch that he was a licensed student Assassin, making him 17 at the time of the main events of the book, when Vimes was 16), Lord Vetinari is tall, thin and dresses all in dusty black, including a black skullcap. In Reaper Man, Mustrum Ridcully likens his appearance to a predatory flamingo, if one existed. His family coat of arms is a plain, simple sable shield, and therefore does not show up against the black coach in which Vetinari travels – black on black ("you had to admit that the bastard had style"). His family motto is Si non confectus, non reficiat (If it ain't broke, don't fix it).

Lord Vetinari lives and works in the Patrician's Palace, which used to be the Royal Winter Palace. He sits on a plain wooden chair at the feet of the Golden Throne of Ankh (much like the Steward of Gondor in The Lord of the Rings). The Throne remains untouched despite being allegedly made of gold, but Vetinari reveals to Captain Carrot that it is actually merely gold foil over rotten-through wood. He accepts interviews in the Oblong Office (a reference to the White House's Oval Office). Notably he does not request, or even demand the presence of any of his citizens, but merely has them informed that they "have an appointment with him", and they are promptly escorted to said appointment. When Vetinari considers the meeting ended, he usually dismisses his visitors with the phrase "don't let me detain you", the inherent implication being that he just might if they let him. He holds meetings in the "Rats Chamber", so named because of its fresco of dancing rats on the ceiling (also a reference to the Star Chamber) and making visitors to the room want to leave and go have a good long bath. Similarly, he deliberately keeps a strange albeit accurate clock in his waiting-room (Feet of Clay, Going Postal) whose ticking goes out of sync just often enough to unnerve people.

His bedroom is spartan; containing little more than a narrow bed and a few battered cupboards. He apparently requires so little sleep and gets up so early that going to bed is merely an excuse to change his clothes ("He has a bedroom. He presumably sleeps" The New Discworld Companion). He is known to always be in his office at very late (or perhaps early) hours, apparently just coinciding with when someone wishes to see him and he wishes to see them. He is not often described as sleeping (exceptions are in Jingo and The Truth), although he has been unconscious several times.

He has one known relative (Lady Roberta "Bobbi" Meserole, his aunt -- named after the winner of a charity auction by Pratchett) who may come from Genua and lives in Pseudopolis. She appears to share his forté for subtle politics. His father apparently died while Havelock was still young, and, according to his aunt, took things much less seriously than his son does.

Though he excels at the Discworld's equivalent of sudoku, Jikan no Muda (時間の無駄; literally, "Waste of Time" in Japanese), and can solve them after glancing at any grid for a few seconds, he finds them unsatisfying, as numbers are too easy to outwit. He enjoys crosswords far more, as one needs to comprehend how another person's mind works when actively trying to mislead. He has found great pleasure in the work of "The Blind Letter Office" at the Post Office, helping to decipher the nigh-illegible gibberish that some of Ankh-Morpork's less educated citizenry address their letters with – for example working out casually that "Duzbuns Hopsit pfarmarrsc" equals "K. Whistler, Baker, 3 Pigsty Hill" (Does Buns Opposite the Pharmacy). The men employed for this job are successful in 'translating' five addresses out of every six, and view Vetinari's casual skill at it with something approaching awe. He is also very good at Thud, also known in the books by its Dwarvish name Hnaflbaflsniflwhifltafl (a reference to the Germanic-Scandinavian Tafl games, specifically Hnefatafl), and plays it to find his own weaknesses unlike other people (Reacher Gilt, Going Postal) who play Thud to find the opponent's weaknesses. The New Discworld Companion also mentions his mastery of Stealth Chess, a game commonly played by assassins' guild students and alumni. In Soul Music, Vetinari is mentioned as preferring to read sheet music rather than listen to music, because the idea of it being performed by people, with all the sweat and saliva involved, strikes him as distasteful.

Though concrete proof is lacking, Lady Margolotta's surprise at Vetinari's apparent lack of aging (The Fifth Elephant) combined with his general eerie personality and inscrutable reputation has occasionally fueled reader suspicions that Vetinari might not be entirely human. Vetinari admits to being "drunk as a skunk" after a banquet at Unseen University, but continues to be startlingly lucid and eloquent, although Drumknott describes him as seeming "unusually talkative" and notices it takes him 15 seconds longer to solve the Ankh-Morpork Times' daily crossword (Unseen Academicals).

=== Pets ===
He did keep a pet, a sixteen-year-old wire-haired terrier called Wuffles. It is said that Wuffles is the only living creature Lord Vetinari actually cares about (unless Ankh-Morpork is considered a living creature, to be thought of as "Morporkia", a nod to "Britannia"). Wuffles has been described as very elderly in two books that take place many years apart. In the novel Making Money, it is shown that Wuffles has, at some recent point, died; reinforcing Vetinari's affection for the dog is the rumour that every week he makes a short (and via a different path) walk to Wuffles' small grave in the palace grounds, every time leaving a dog biscuit, though this may be entirely untrue, or may simply be done to add a layer of apparent human weakness to those seeking one.

As of Making Money he is now caring for another dog – "Mr. Fusspot", the former pet of the late Topsy Lavish (née Turvy), Chairwoman of the Royal Bank and Mint. Thanks to an unusual will and Topsy's contempt for her in-laws; the rest of the Lavish family, Mr. Fusspot is formally and legally the current chairman. This leads to the debate whether this gives Vetinari control of the bank and mint, since Topsy's will states the person caring for Mr. Fusspot is also the executor of "the chairman's" wishes for both concerns. The authority rested in Moist von Lipwig, the current Master of the Mint and temporary caretaker of Mr. Fusspot before Vetinari adopted/seized/confiscated the dog. There has been concern over the quality of Vetinari's care of the dog, though no one wishes to risk raising the issue with him.

== Bibliography ==
Lord Vetinari makes featured appearances in the Discworld novels Sourcery, Guards! Guards!, Moving Pictures, Reaper Man, Men at Arms, Feet of Clay, Jingo, Interesting Times, Soul Music, The Fifth Elephant, The Truth, The Last Hero, Going Postal, Thud!, Making Money, Unseen Academicals, Snuff and Raising Steam. Night Watch features him in his youth.

While the first mention of an otherwise unnamed Patrician occurs in The Colour of Magic, that character's description does not wholly align with Vetinari's later characterization (specifically being described as obese, which was a trait of previous rulers Lord Winder or Snapcase but not himself). Pratchett has stated on Usenet that the Patrician in this case is indeed Vetinari, and that he simply lost weight due to the stress of his job. Upon being pressed, he admitted that the only real difference is that he has become a better writer since that time. It is also a reflection of the fact that the Discworld timeline is extremely uncertain.

=== Other media ===
Pratchett's own choice of actor to play Vetinari was Alan Rickman. Vetinari was played by Crawford Logan in the 1992 BBC Radio 4 adaptation of Guards! Guards!. In television adaptations, the character has been portrayed by several actors: Jeremy Irons in TV movie adaptation of Colour of Magic, Charles Dance in the TV movie adaptation of Going Postal, and Anna Chancellor in the television series The Watch. In the video game Discworld Noir, his voice was performed by Rob Brydon.

== Reception ==
Vetinari was included in a list of the top ten Discworld characters by The Daily Telegraph in 2013; Tim Martin describes the character as "The kind of benign despot who would make Machiavelli faint with fear and envy".

Matthew Sangster, in an article in Journal of the Fantastic in the Arts, describes the character's "fantastical hypercompetence" as giving Pratchett a means to "skip over certain intricacies to imagine effects, affects, and consequences". Andrew Rayment, in a wide-ranging article on postmodernity, politics and fantasy in the journal Postmodern Studies, characterizes Vetinari's decision to legalize the Guild of Thieves as a device for Pratchett to parody the fact that "official law is supported by the unwritten supplement that guarantees its functioning". He discusses Vetinari's attitude to journalistic truth and the freedom of the press in The Truth, stating that "he understands that part of the ideological role of newspapers is to reproduce already existing values about what the world is so that people can '"recognise" themselves in their world'", formulated in the form of news versus Vetinari's coinage "olds", and concluding that "Vetinari, as always, is right". Rayment goes on to highlight Vetinari's use of language, commenting on a scene in Unseen Academicals, that the character "change[s] the world with a flick (through) of a thesaurus".

Gideon Haberkorn, in an article in Journal of the Fantastic in the Arts, describes Vetinari as a "realist" who is "no hero", and who provides a complementary viewpoint to Sam Vimes's cynicism and Carrot Ironfoundersson's idealism. In a review of Thud! for The Times, the novelist A. S. Byatt also compares the three characters, describing Vetinari's "chess-playing ordering of imperfect social beings" as being, as the series goes on, "ever more subtly" distinguished from Vimes's "sense of responsibility for his patch" and Carrot's "natural authority and courage".

== See also ==
- Enlightened absolutism
- VLC media player, whose version 3.0 was given the codename Vetinari.
