= Sam Vimes =

Fictional character of the Discworld novels

- Discworld character
- Sam Vimes as envisaged by Paul Kidby
- First appearance: Guards! Guards! (1989)
- Last appearance: Raising Steam (2013)
- Created by: Terry Pratchett
- Portrayed by: Richard Dormer; Paul Darrow
- Voiced by: John Wood; Philip Jackson; Rob Brydon

In-universe information
- Nickname: Sam
- Title(s): Duke of Ankh, Commander of the City Watch
- Affiliation: Ankh-Morpork City Watch
- Spouse: Sybil Ramkin
- Children: Samuel Vimes II ("Young Sam")
- Home: Ankh-Morpork

His Grace, The Duke of Ankh, Commander Sir Samuel "Sam" Vimes is a fictional character in Terry Pratchett's Discworld series of novels and short stories. He is a major character in six novels and one short story, the first being the 1989 novel Guards! Guards! and the last the 2011 novel Snuff, and makes secondary or minor appearances in a further ten books.

Vimes is introduced as the disillusioned captain of the small and ineffectual Night Watch of the Discworld city of Ankh-Morpork, and subsequent appearances chart his slow and often reluctant rise through the ranks of society and his reform of the Watch into a modern and effective police force. Pratchett imagined the character as looking similar to the actor Pete Postlethwaite, and Paul Kidby, who illustrated several of the Discworld novels, gave him a resemblance to Clint Eastwood.

The character is one of Pratchett's most popular, and been noted for his "moral pragmatism" and sense of duty and justice. Pratchett's "boots theory of socioeconomic unfairness", which argues that poor people spend more on boots than rich people in the long term due to having to repeatedly buy cheap but poor-quality footwear, is attributed to Vimes in the 1993 novel Men at Arms.

== Development ==
Marc Burrows writing in The Magic of Terry Pratchett argued that some of Vimes’s traits can be seen in Sergeant Bunyan in the stories Terry Pratchett wrote for the children’s comer of the Bucks Free Press around 1966.

== Appearances ==
=== Novels ===
Sam Vimes is the central character in Guards! Guards! (1989), Men at Arms (1993), Feet of Clay (1996), Jingo (1997), The Fifth Elephant (1999), Night Watch (2002), Thud! (2005), and Snuff (2011). He is a secondary character in The Truth (2000) and Monstrous Regiment (2003) and has minor appearances in The Last Hero (2001), Going Postal (2004), Making Money (2007), Unseen Academicals (2009), I Shall Wear Midnight and Raising Steam (2013). He also appears in the picture book Where's My Cow? (2005) and is mentioned, although not by name, in The Amazing Maurice and His Educated Rodents (2001).

=== Other media ===
Guards! Guards! was adapted for BBC Radio 5 in 1992 and stars John Wood as Vimes. Night Watch was adapted for BBC Radio 4 in 2007, with Philip Jackson as Vimes.

A stage adaptation of Guards! Guards! went on tour in 1998 in which Vimes was played by Paul Darrow.

Vimes appears in the 1999 video game Discworld Noir, voiced by Rob Brydon.

Vimes is played by Richard Dormer in the 2021 BBC television series The Watch, which is "inspired by the legendary ‘City Watch’ subset of Sir Terry Pratchett’s bestselling 'Discworld' novels".

== Character ==
Terry Pratchett gave his view on Vimes in a 2004 Usenet message: "Vimes is fundamentally a person. He fears he may be a bad person because he knows what he thinks rather than just what he says and does. He chokes off all of those little reactions and impulses, but he knows what they are. So he tries to act like a good person, often in situations where the map is unclear."

The character is one of Pratchett's most popular, and been noted for his "moral pragmatism" and sense of duty and justice. Discussing Pratchett's legacy in The Guardian, Andrew Brown wrote that Vimes "may be the most fully realised decent man in modern literature," while the Hollywood Reporter has described him as "Inspector Morse-meets-Humphrey Bogart-esque".

The Cretaceous conifer species Pseudotorellia vimesiana is named after Sam Vimes.

== Boots theory ==
In the 1993 novel Men at Arms, Vimes proposes the "Sam Vimes boots theory of socioeconomic unfairness", which is as follows:

The reason that the rich were so rich, Vimes reasoned, was because they managed to spend less money.

Take boots, for example. He earned thirty-eight dollars a month plus allowances. A really good pair of leather boots cost fifty dollars. But an affordable pair of boots, which were sort of OK for a season or two and then leaked like hell when the cardboard gave out, cost about ten dollars. Those were the kind of boots Vimes always bought, and wore until the soles were so thin that he could tell where he was in Ankh-Morpork on a foggy night by the feel of the cobbles.

But the thing was that good boots lasted for years and years. A man who could afford fifty dollars had a pair of boots that’d still be keeping his feet dry in ten years’ time, while the poor man who could only afford cheap boots would have spent a hundred dollars on boots in the same time and would still have wet feet.

The theory has since been mentioned independently of the novel in The Guardian, The New York Times, and the New Statesman.

== See also ==
- Ankh-Morpork City Watch members
- Boots theory
