= Clacks =

Clacks may refer to:

- Clackmannanshire (abbreviated Clacks), historic county, council area, registration county and lieutenancy area in Scotland
- Clacks, fictional optical telegraphy in Terry Pratchett's Discworld series, first appearing in the 1999 novel The Fifth Elephant and later expanded upon, particularly in the 2004 novel Going Postal.
