= Ankh-Morpork City Watch =

Fictional organization from Terry Pratchett's Discworld novel series

The Ankh-Morpork City Watch is a fictional police force appearing in Terry Pratchett's Discworld series. The Watch is based in the city of Ankh-Morpork, though some stories feature its members elsewhere in the Discworld.

The Watch and its members are the central focus of eight novels and one short story, listed below in order of publication:

- Guards! Guards! (1989);
- "Theatre of Cruelty" (1993) (short story);
- Men at Arms (1993);
- Feet of Clay (1996);
- Jingo (1997);
- The Fifth Elephant (1999);
- Night Watch (2002);
- Thud! (2005);
- Snuff (2011)

The novels generally feature Watch Commander Sam Vimes as protagonist and often draw on the conventions of crime novels. The Watch and its members also appear as secondary characters in other Discworld books, particularly those set in Ankh-Morpork.

The Watch was a loose inspiration for the 2021 fantasy police procedural television series The Watch.

== Style ==
Commentators have noted that Pratchett's depiction of the Watch draws on a longstanding fantasy tradition in which city guards "rush in and die or run away." His treatment of the trope ranges from parody in the early novels to "deeper satire" in later works.

== Fictional history (before the time in which the novels are set) ==
Note: Some of the information repeated below was taken from The Discworld Companion and the 1999 Discworld Diary, which had a City Watch theme, and has not been confirmed in any of the Discworld novels.

"The Ankh-Morpork Watch & Ward" was established in AM 1561 by King Veltrick I. Its members were equipped with full copper armour and a copper shield inscribed with the king’s motto, Fabricati Diem, Pvncti Agvnt Celeriter ("Make the day, the moments pass quickly"). Veltrick was assassinated four days later by his son, who became King Veltrick II. The new king showed little interest in maintaining a police force, and the Watch’s equipment quickly deteriorated.

At this time, four distinct organizations operated in the city:

- "Palace Guard", responsible for protecting the royal palace.
- The "Cable Street Particulars", a political police force focused on uncovering plots against the rulers of Ankh-Morpork. The name may have been inspired by the Baker Street Irregulars from the stories of Sherlock Holmes, and perhaps by the Battle of Cable Street, a riot started between Oswald Mosley's British Union of Fascists and anti-fascist protesters in 1936. They are also known as The Unmentionables (a colloquial British term for underwear), possibly a parody of The Invincibles, an Irish extremist nationalist group, or of The Untouchables, a prohibition-era law-enforcement group, who served as government intelligence.
- The "Ward", served as daytime gate guards and thief-takers.
- The "Watch", performed similar duties during the night. At its peak the Watch included one commander, five captains, ten sergeants, forty corporals, lance-corporals, constables, lance-constables, and, in times of emergency, a variable militia of citizens.

Public opinion of both the Day Watch (formerly the Ward) and the Night Watch was consistently poor. It reached an extreme when a commander, who had urged citizens not to take the law into their own hands, was drowned in the Ankh by a mob shouting, "If it’s not in our hands, whose hands is it in?" By this time, the city’s guilds were largely responsible for policing their own members, and the Watch was increasingly marginalized.

The Watch experienced a brief revival in AM 1688, following the Ankh-Morpork Civil War, when Commander Suffer-Not-Injustice Vimes and his Ironheads assumed control of the city. After his deposition and the restoration of the Patrician system, however, the Watch again declined in influence. Under the Patricians, guild law applied within the guilds while elsewhere the only effective authority was the ruling Patrician.

During the rule of Lord Winder, few Watch Houses remained in operation. The Cable Street Particulars were thriving, however, having morphed from an intelligence agency into a secret police force employing torture with gusto. During the Glorious Revolution of the Twenty-Fifth of May, their building was burnt down by members of the Night Watch from Treacle Mine Road. The change in Patricians did not lead to an improvement in the public perception of the Watch, and when Lord Vetinari replaced Mad Lord Snapcase, and even theft was legalised, there seemed to be no point to them at all.

The dysfunctional Night Watch now comprised three men, based in the old Treacle Mine Road Watch House. While the Day Watch had become another of the city's gangs, the Night Watch was just inactive.

== History according to plot of novels ==
The Watch is revitalized when Carrot Ironfoundersson joins as a constable and the Night Watch prevents a dragon from destroying the city. After their original headquarters are destroyed, the Watch relocates to larger premises at Pseudopolis Yard, a name referencing Scotland Yard. Membership expands significantly, with recruits from ethnic minorities including dwarfs, trolls, and undead. The Watch also eventually admits a vampire, a werewolf, an Igor, and a Nac Mac Feegle. After the Watch saves the Patrician’s life he authorizes an expansion of its authority and stature, leading to the establishment of Section Houses throughout the city. The remnants of the Day Watch are incorporated into a unified City Watch under the command of Sam Vimes.

The Watch evolves into a modern-style police force, focusing on crime prevention and investigation rather than traditional thief-taking. New divisions are created, including a forensics unit, a Traffic Division, and a plain-clothes section replacing the Cable Street Particulars. A further addition is the Specials, based on the Watch’s historic right to raise a citizens' militia when required.

Many watchmen trained in Ankh-Morpork later take positions in other cities, where they are colloquially known as "Sammies," a parallel to the British "Bobbies." They maintain contact through the semaphore telegraph system known as the clacks, a satirical reference to international police organizations such as Interpol.

Several real-world species have been named after Watch characters. These include the Cretaceous gymnosperm Czekanowskia anguae, named after Angua von Überwald; Pseudotorellia vimesiana, named after Sam Vimes; and Torreyites detriti, named after the troll Detritus.

== Members ==
The primary members of the Ankh-Morpork City Watch are (see the linked articles for full details of the characters):

=== His Grace, The Duke of Ankh, Commander Sir Samuel Vimes ===
Samuel Vimes, Commander of the City Watch, learned dirty tricks as a street copper and passed them on to new recruits. Under him, the Watch strengthens its position, and while he makes many enemies, the Assassins' Guild has stopped accepting contracts for his assassination.

He marries Lady Sybil Ramkin, the richest woman in Ankh-Morpork, and together they have a son, Young Sam.

=== Captain Carrot Ironfoundersson ===
Adopted by dwarfs as an infant, Carrot grew up in the mines of the Copperhead mountains. He is "six feet six inches tall and nearly as broad across the shoulders". His dwarfish name is Kzad-bhat, which, roughly translated, means "Head Banger", a logical nickname for a 6-foot-6-inch-tall (1.98 m) man living in a mine built by 4-foot-tall (1.2 m) dwarfs. He was surprised to learn that he was human. His adoptive father thought it best that he goes live among humans and found him a job in Ankh-Morpork with the Night Watch, believing them respected and respectable. Carrot was "barely 16 years old". (Guards! Guards!)

Carrot joins the Night Watch when it is still a small group of misfits who run from criminals rather than arrest them (Guards! Guards!). His old-fashioned view of justice leads him on his first day as a constable to arrest the leader of the entirely legal Thieves' Guild, but he later understands the city better.

Captain Carrot comes to know the city's one-million population by name and tax status, and is big on paperwork and organization. He takes the time to see all sides of a story before acting. When Sam Vimes plans to retire after marrying Lady Sybil Ramkin, Carrot is promoted to the captaincy. Carrot becomes famous enough for action figures of him to appear. (Hogfather)

Carrot's main talents are his charisma and "supernatural likability". He genuinely likes people, in contrast to Vimes, who "doesn't like anybody". He is often shown getting people to do things no one else could force them to do, simply by assuming that they will: for example, his outreach programs for at-risk Ankh-Morporkian youth treat them like boy scouts. When he directly commands someone, they find it very difficult to disobey. Even Vimes is susceptible to this power. Carrot prefers not to use this except in dire emergencies.

Carrot often seems unthreatening, a dangerous conclusion if one is unlucky enough to disappoint him. People think Carrot is simple, and the narrator occasionally points out that while that is true, people often mistake "simple" for "stupid". Carrot's simplicity is cunning (which he may have learned from Vimes). In Soul Music, Carrot adds questions to the quiz machine in the Mended Drum, asking players who was responsible for recent crimes and frequently makes arrests as a result. In Theatre of Cruelty, lacking any living witnesses to a murder, he interviews Death as part of his investigation.

Carrot sees the bright side of life. When Angua, a werewolf, tells him that her brother Andrei is stuck in wolf form and lives as a champion sheepdog, Carrot notes that he is a champion. Carrot has also promised Angua, at her request, that if she ever follows in her brother Wolfgang's murderous footsteps, he will be the one to stop her.

It is commonly suspected (and somewhat of an open secret) that Carrot is the true heir to the throne of Ankh-Morpork, but he does not acknowledge it, and has even hidden evidence of his royal heritage. Havelock Vetinari considers him useful, as he makes any attempt to claiming to be the true heir impossible, and any complaints that only a king has the authority to do something can simply be deferred to Carrot.

Carrot himself never uses his royal powers or acknowledges his royal heritage. After he learns about it in Men at Arms, he confides to Vetinari that he wants people to obey the law because it is the law, not because "Captain Carrot is good at being obeyed". He says he is content to ring a bell and yell all's well, "provided of course that 'all is well".

Carrot on rare occasions does use his royal powers to make things happen. In Jingo, Vetinari made Vimes a Duke, something only a King can do, while Carrot was present—noting that he "had been reminded" that Vimes could have the title. In The Fifth Elephant, faced with the defection of most members of the Watch under Sergeant Fred Colon (then an acting captain), Carrot puts his plain and battered royal sword on a desk in plain sight and reminds Watch members that they took an oath to the King, and the King had not relieved them of it.

Carrot is the stereotypical "perfect" policeman: totally honest, law-abiding, and determined to be friends with everyone. People of all species can't help but want to behave well in his presence. His love for everyone distresses Angua, who worries that he loves her no more than he loves anyone else. He puts the welfare of the public above both hers and his own, but when she was in danger, he traveled to the rim of the Disc to save her.

In Jingo, Angua is kidnapped on a Klatchian ship and The Watch pursues it. Carrot does not worry, but sensibly, gets some sleep to be ready to rescue her. Sam Vimes and the ship's captain see the sense of this, but cannot believe that someone in love can be so sensible.

In The Art of Discworld Pratchett says that Carrot has a bright future, "should Lord Vetinari not survive the next assassination attempt", and notes that although most people envision Carrot as Arnold Schwarzenegger, he is actually more like Liam Neeson. In both the Discworld computer game and the BBC Radio production of Guards! Guards!, he speaks with a Welsh accent.

=== Captain Angua von Überwald ===
Captain Delphine Angua von Überwald is a member of the Ankh-Morpork City Watch, originally hired under an affirmative action plan by Lord Vetinari. She first appeared in Men at Arms. Her beauty led colleagues to predict that criminals would line up to be arrested by her, but Angua's surprising strength and tough attitude soon make her one of the most feared officers of the Watch. Angua is a werewolf, but maintains a strict vegetarian diet in her human phase and eats only chickens as a wolf.

In the 1999 computer game Discworld Noir, and the 2001 books-on-tape version of Men at Arms, her name is pronounced "An-gyoo-uh" with a hard "g". Terry Pratchett wrote on the official terrypratchettbooks.com forum: "it's Ang as in Anger, u as in you, a as in a thing".

Among her siblings, only Angua and her brother Wolfgang can shape-shift at will. Wolfgang is depicted as extremely violent, killing and sometimes eating humans he considers "inferior".

Angua moved to Ankh-Morpork and became the first woman to join the City Watch. She and Corporal Carrot Ironfoundersson fell in love. Carrot doesn't seem bothered by the fact that Angua is a werewolf, but Angua worries that their differences will eventually doom the relationship.

Throughout the book Feet of Clay Angua debates returning to Überwald to live among other werewolves. In the end, she stays in Ankh-Morpork.

Angua also befriends Gaspode, a small dog with matted fur who intermittently gains and loses the ability to speak in Moving Pictures, then by the time Men at Arms begins regains it by sleeping near Unseen University's High-Energy Magic building. Gaspode flirts with Angua and helps her on her missions.

The Fifth Elephant is the first Discworld book to reveal much about Angua's background, and her parents and brother Wolfgang all figure in the story. Angua's relationship with actual wolves also provides some tension.

The presence of a werewolf in the Watch becomes common knowledge in Ankh-Morpork, but Angua remains undisturbed, as the werewolf is generally assumed to be Nobby Nobbs; Carrot, Vimes, Vetinari, and Angua herself all play along. However The Truth reveals in passing that several members of the Ankh-Morpork aristocracy and the lawyer Mr Slant does know her nature. In Making Money, Moist von Lipwig also figures this out when he sees Angua in werewolf form with Nobby. Though the widespread recognition of the werewolf presence in the Watch has not inconvenienced Angua on a human level, the city's criminal underworld learns to evade capture, for example with a scent bomb like The New Firm (Mr. Pin and Mr. Tulip) use in The Truth.

Angua helps Vimes on another diplomatic mission in Monstrous Regiment, and in Going Postal is mentioned as difficult to elude. Angua also appears in Thud!, which features the Watch's first vampire officer, Sally.

Though Angua is deeply committed to Carrot—at one point describing herself as his "dog"—others express romantic interest in her. A wolf named Gavin in The Fifth Elephant, provides tension, and the small wealthy mutt Mr. Fusspot in Making Money proposes marriage.

I Shall Wear Midnight notes that Angua is newly promoted to captain.

In the 2010 Sky television adaptation of Going Postal, Angua was played by Ingrid Bolsø Berdal.

=== Sergeant Fred Colon ===
Frederick "Fred" Colon was a long serving sergeant in the City Watch. He may have been first mentioned in The Colour of Magic as the "sergeant of the Watch" who enters the then Broken Drum. He is described on several occasions as "one of nature's sergeants": overweight, cautious, reluctant to exert himself, and unimaginative. He generally guards bridges or large buildings against theft. He was a corporal in the Watch at the time Sam Vimes first joined, and subsequent to this spent some time in the army (the Duke of Quirm's Middleweight Infantry and then the Duke of Eorle's First Heavy Infantry), before returning to the Watch.

In The Fifth Elephant, Colon becomes the head of the Traffic Squad, which also includes his friend Nobby Nobbs. This role fits him perfectly, especially since the Traffic Squad is "self-financing" (they keep the fines). A brief promotion to acting-captain proved a disaster as everyone, including Colon himself, expected. He currently holds the dual positions of Custody Officer and Watch Liaison Officer: jobs so vague that no one knows what they entail, least of all Colon himself. Their purpose is to avoid overburdening his brain with responsibility, and to also avoid the catastrophic possibility that he might have a task of any real importance. His office, in a separate building from the main watch house, is frequented by old acquaintances who want somewhere quiet to get away from the wife, hear what is happening on the street and—in Vimes' words—"gossip like washerwomen." Vimes considers this free-flowing source of information well worth the price of the doughnuts.

Vimes thought most other watch officers saw a fat, stupid, lazy, and cowardly man, and that this was mostly what was there. But Colon and Nobby have a street-level knowledge of Ankh-Morpork on a par with his own, and are good at sensing tension in a crowd. Both also survived the Glorious 25 May when, in the aftermath of a coup in Night Watch, an assortment of police and hangers-on (including a then-apprentice assassin named Vetinari) took out the remnants of the outgoing regime's secret police, though at a cost. Colon performs his duties in Thud! fairly well, is an amiable jailer, bright enough to keep his keys in a closed tin box in the bottom drawer of his desk, well out of reach of anything an inmate could use to snag them. He is often portrayed as prejudiced, but his prejudice is so non-specific and naive, frequently short-lived when he actually meets one of the group in question, that nobody takes him seriously.

He might be related to Sergeant Doppelpunkt (German for the punctuation mark colon), half of the town watch in Bad Blintz, Überwald, (The Amazing Maurice and his Educated Rodents). Other Discworld characters notably similar to Colon include one of the guard in the Überwald town of Bonk, nicknamed "Colonesque" by Samuel Vimes, and one of the market guards in Al Khali, Klatch. As with the various Dibblers, this may be due to morphic resonance.

Colon is married, but his wife works during the day, and since he works at night, the two seldom see each other and communicate by leaving notes. Vimes privately attributes the longevity of Fred's marriage to this arrangement. Guards! Guards! notes that they have children, which Vimes credits to "persuasive handwriting."

Colon briefly appears in the Cosgrove Hall adaptation of Soul Music. In the BBC Radio 4 adaptation of Guards! Guards! he was voiced by Stephen Thorne, and in the 1998 stage play Roger Bingham portrayed him. In the Radio 4 adaptation of Night Watch, he was voiced by Sam Dale.

=== Corporal Nobby Nobbs ===
Cecil Wormsborough St. John "Nobby" Nobbs is untidy, smelly, and about the size of a dwarf. He carries a certificate to prove he is, on the balance of probabilities, a human being. A running joke is the inability of others to believe this, despite—or even because of—the evidence. Samuel Vimes is Nobby's commanding officer, and Sergeant Fred Colon his partner and longtime friend. Nobby and Colon have strangely philosophical conversations, including one on whether Death has a first name, or even any friends to use it. Oddly, these conversations hint at Nobby having more intelligence than Colon. Nobby is continually pointing out fatal flaws in Colon's statements and arguments, and Colon mentally scrambles to come up with an answer (not unlike some byplay in Laurel and Hardy films). Nobby likes folk dancing.

As a street urchin he was a major source of information for city notables. His abusive father broke his leg at least once and Vimes noted in Night Watch that Nobby's father used to break his arms. Young Nobby sometimes referred to his father as "Number One Suspect", and was afraid of prison because his father was there.

He was inspired to join the Watch after meeting Sergeant-At-Arms John Keel (Sam Vimes, due to time travel), who gave him a spoon. His father subsequently stole it when he was released from prison.

Nobby was once thought by some to be the Earl of Ankh, but this was a ploy to make him king, as he was thought easier to manipulate than Carrot. But, being less tractable than expected, Nobby turned down a life as the figurehead ruler of Ankh-Morpork. He said later that he was afraid of what Vimes would say when he found out. His family had long believed that there is always a catch, so they never volunteer for anything.

Nonetheless, the ending of Feet of Clay, suggests that he may truly have been a nobleman, with family heirlooms he never mentions. His small stature and odd features may be a jab at royal inbreeding. But the Nobbses have stolen so much over the years, Vimes notes, "you could probably prove Nobby was the Dowager Duchess of Quirm".

Nobby helped resolve the "war" between Ankh-Morpork and Klatch in Jingo. In recognition, the Patrician gave him a new job in traffic control, and then "promoted" Fred Colon to Watch Liaison Officer, a job vague enough to ensure he never had to do anything actually important.

Ironically, Nobby also ends the war between the dwarfs and the trolls. In Thud an ancient artifact called a Cube reveals that the Battle of Koom Valley, the main reason for the continuing hatred between the two races, was supposed to be a chance for the two Kings to discuss peace. Nobby steals the Cube, but the reader does not learn this until Vimes tells him to hand it over. Vimes works out how to make the Cube play its message in the presence of the current King of the Dwarves, and the truth of Koom Valley is heard for the first time in hundreds of years.

Nobby thinks he has a romantic relationship with Verity "Hammerhead" Pushpram, a girl who runs a fish stall. Her nickname comes from the fact that her eyes appear to look in opposite directions. However, the relationship seems to consist solely of her hitting him with a fish and telling him to bugger off. He remains "faithful" to her, however, in all books except Thud!, in which he temporarily has a relationship with exotic dancer Tawneee. In Snuff he appears have a romantic relationship with goblin girl Shine of the Rainbow. In "Raising Steam", Colon says Nobby is "practically married".

Nobby may be related to Corporal Knopf half of the town watch of Bad Blintz, Überwald in The Amazing Maurice and his Educated Rodents. Other characters with a notable similarity to Nobby include a member of the guard in the Überwald town of Bonk, nicknamed "Nobbski" by Vimes, and one of the market guards in Al Khali, Klatch. Morphic resonance may have caused this, as with the various incarnations of Dibbler. But being related to Nobby is not seen as a good thing. An Unseen University bledlow who by sheer coincidence shared Nobby's last name swiftly denied any family ties.

The Pratchett Portfolio says Nobby is known for saying "'tis a lie sir, I never done it," but he has not actually been recorded saying it.

When Nobby was in Klatch he "got in touch with his feminine side", and liked to wear women's clothing. He also dressed up as an old lady for a Traffic scam, to which Vimes put an end.

Nobby briefly appeared in the Cosgrove Hall adaptation of Soul Music. In the BBC Radio 4 adaptation of Guards! Guards! he was voiced by Melvyn Hayes. David Brett, formerly of the Flying Pickets played Nobby in the 1988 stage play. Nobby also appears in two computer adventure games, Discworld (The Trouble With Dragons), where he was voiced by Tony Robinson, and Discworld Noir, where he was voiced by Rob Brydon). In both games, Nobby was voiced with a distinct Irish accent. In the 2006 TV adaptation of Hogfather Nicolas Tennant played Nobby.

=== Sergeant Detritus ===
Detritus is the first troll to join the City Watch.

=== Sergeant Cheery Littlebottom ===
Cheery Littlebottom, a female dwarf, is a forensic expert in the City Watch, introduced in Feet of Clay.

=== Lance-Constable Salacia "Sally" von Humpeding ===
Sally joined the Ankh-Morpork City Watch despite Vimes's reluctance to have a vampire on the force. She is invariably described as looking stunning in any outfit—much to Angua's irritation, as Angua feels diminished in Sally’s presence and views her as a rival for Captain Carrot’s affections.

=== Constable Dorfl ===
Introduced in the "Feet of clay", first golem constable.

=== Constable Visit-the-Infidel/Ungodly-with-Explanatory-Pamphlets ===
Visit-the-Infidel-with-Explanatory-Pamphlets (sometimes referred to as Visit-the-Ungodly-with-Explanatory-Pamphlets) is a constable of the City Watch. He is generally referred to as "Constable Visit", or occasionally "Washpot" from one of his favourite quotations, "Moab is my washpot. Over Edom will I cast out my shoe", from Psalm 60 of The Book of Om.

He first appeared in Feet of Clay. Samuel Vimes says he is a good copper, his highest form of personal praise. He is a gentle but determined Omnian proselytiser who can clear a large crowd in seconds by talking religion and offering pamphlets.

When off-duty, he goes door to door with fellow Omnian Smite-the-Unbeliever-with-Cunning-Arguments. Not afraid of Visit's proselytising, his friend and fellow constable Dorfl, a golem with endless patience, wants to argue faith rationally.

He appears in the Sky One television adaptation of Hogfather, portrayed by Richard Katz.

=== Inspector A E Pessimal ===
A. E. Pessimal was first the government Inspector of the Watch assigned (in Thud!) by Lord Vetinari to inspect the Watch and judge whether they gave fair value ("who watches the watchmen?") and to inspect the Unseen University in A Collegiate Casting-Out of Devilish Devices.

Described as a neat little man with very shiny shoes, no friends, and no sense of humour, he does not have a first name, and was "initialled" at birth rather than named. He could have seriously inconvenienced Vimes with difficult questions such as: "Why is C. W. St. J. 'Nobby' Nobbs in the Watch?"

Vimes eventually swore him in as a special constable for the duration of an impending street fight of roughly a thousand trolls and dwarves, to scare the man and show him what it was like to be a copper. Instead, A E took his position seriously, to the point of bare-handedly attacking and trying to bite a troll who took a swing at Vimes. This totally shocked Vetinari ("Mr. Pessimal? Mr. A. E. Pessimal? We are talking about the same person? Small man, very clean shoes?").

Vimes offered him the position of Lance-Constable and adjutant, needing someone to look through paperwork and sift out important or suspicious facts. A E is the start of an internal affairs department in the Watch.

In Snuff, A E is a newly minted Inspector Of the Watch, and his forensic accounting has become legendary and feared throughout Ankh-Morpork.

=== Constable Igor ===
Igor was an Igor his family considered "too modern" for Überwald, He specialised in genetics and created a rabbit named Eerie, on which he grew human ears. He bred noses as independent lifeforms until they were transplanted. He experimented with swimming potatoes hoping for instant fish and chips. Like all Igors, he is a highly talented transplant surgeon.

He sometimes forgets to lisp. Vimes hired him for his surgery methods, considerably more advanced than in Ankh-Morpork. Igor first appears in The Fifth Elephant. He and Sergeant Cheery Littlebottom form the Watch forensics department.

=== Constable Downspout ===
Constable Downspout first appears in Feet of Clay, and is a surveillance expert for the Watch. As a gargoyle, he is able to remain motionless in one spot and watch for days at a time, a "world champion at not moving" as Vimes once remarked. He has no use for money and instead receives his salary in pigeons, which he eats.

=== Corporal Buggy Swires ===
A gnome. Introduced in Jingo or possibly in The Light Fantastic, which mentions a gnome identified only as Swires, Buggy has the hard-nosed, bellicose personality typical of his species, and can shout down uncooperative witnesses despite being only six inches tall. He has established himself as the sole member of the Watch's Airborne Section except perhaps Wee Mad Arthur, by taming various birds (acquired from the Pictsies for a crate of whisky) as transport for reconnaissance and messaging.
