= Night Watch (Pratchett novel) =

2002 Discworld novel by Terry Pratchett

- Author: Terry Pratchett
- Cover artist: Paul Kidby
- Language: English
- Series: Discworld; 29th novel – 6th City Watch novel (7th story)
- Subject: Time travel, cop novels, revolutions; Characters: Ankh-Morpork City Watch, Sam Vimes and Lu Tze; Locations: Ankh-Morpork
- Genre: Fantasy
- Publisher: Doubleday
- Publication date: 2002
- Awards: Prometheus Award, 2003; Came 73rd in the Big Read
- ISBN: 0-385-60264-2
- Preceded by: The Amazing Maurice and His Educated Rodents
- Followed by: The Wee Free Men

Night Watch is a fantasy novel by British writer Terry Pratchett, the 29th book in his Discworld series, and the sixth starring the City Watch, published in 2002. The protagonist of the novel is Sir Samuel Vimes, commander of the Ankh-Morpork City Watch. A five-part radio adaptation of the novel was broadcast on BBC Radio 4. Night Watch placed second in the annual Locus Poll for best fantasy novel. In late 2024 Penguin announced that Night Watch would be added to the Penguin Modern Classics range, with a new introduction by Pratchett's personal assistant and friend Rob Wilkins, and annotations by Prof David Lloyd and Dr Darryl Jones.

== Plot summary ==
On the morning of the 30th anniversary of the Glorious Revolution of the Twenty-Fifth of May (and as such the anniversary of the death of John Keel, Vimes' hero and former mentor), Sam Vimes—whose wife is in labour with their first child—is caught in a lightning storm while pursuing Carcer, a notorious criminal who has murdered several watchmen, to the roof of the Unseen University's Library. He awakens to find that he has somehow been sent back in time.

Vimes's first idea is to ask the wizards at the Unseen University to send him home, but before he can act on this, he is arrested for breaking curfew by a younger version of himself. Incarcerated in a cell next to his is Carcer, who after being released joins the Cable Street Particulars (otherwise known as the Unmentionables), the secret police carrying out the paranoid whims of the Patrician of the time, Homicidal Lord Winder.

When he is taken to be interrogated by the captain, time is frozen by Lu-Tze, who tells Vimes what has happened and that he must assume the identity of Sergeant-At-Arms John Keel, who was to have arrived that day but was murdered by Carcer. It is stated that the event which caused Vimes and Carcer to be sent into the past was a major temporal shattering. Vimes then returns to the office, time restarts and he convinces the captain that he is Keel.

Young Vimes believes Vimes to be Keel, allowing Vimes to teach Young Vimes the lessons for which Vimes idolized Keel. Vimes, taking command of the watchmen, successfully avoids the major bloodshed erupting all over the city and manages to keep his part of it relatively peaceful. After dealing with the Unmentionables' headquarters he has his haphazard forces barricade a few streets to keep people safe from the fighting between rebels and soldiers. However, the barricades are gradually pushed forward during the night (by Fred Colon and several other simple-minded watchmen) to encompass the surrounding streets until Vimes finds himself in control of a quarter of the city containing most of its food supplies, dubbed "The Glorious People's Republic of Treacle Mine Road", with a still-living Reg Shoe as one of the leading figures.

The ruler, Lord Winder, is effectively assassinated by the young Assassin's Guild student Havelock Vetinari, and the new Patrician Lord Snapcase calls for a complete amnesty. However, he sees Keel as a threat and sends Carcer to lead a death squad of Unmentionables, watchmen and the palace guard to murder Keel. Several policemen (the ones who died when the barricade fell in the original timeline) are killed in the battle, as is Reg Shoe; Vimes manages to fight off the attack until he can grab Carcer, at which point they are returned to the future and Keel's body is placed in the timeline Vimes has just left, to tie things up, as in the "real" history, Keel died in that fight.

Vimes' son is born, with the help of Doctor "Mossy" Lawn, whom Vimes met while in the past, and Vimes finally arrests Carcer, promising him a fair trial before he is hanged. A subsequent conversation with Lord Vetinari reveals that the Patrician alone knows Vimes took Keel's place, also that he fought alongside Keel's men against Carcer's death squad. He proposes that the old Watch House at Treacle Mine Road (where Keel was sergeant, and which was destroyed by the dragon in Guards! Guards!) be rebuilt, as Vimes outright refuses a monument commemorating the Twenty-Fifth of May.

== Characters ==
- Carcer
- Sergeant Fred Colon
- Cut-Me-Own-Throat Dibbler
- Dr. Lawn
- Lu-Tze (Sweeper)
- Corporal Nobby Nobbs
- Lady Sybil Ramkin
- Reg Shoe
- Mr Slant
- Havelock Vetinari
- Sir Samuel Vimes

== Background and publication ==
Night Watch is the twenty-ninth novel in the comic fantasy Discworld series, written by Terry Pratchett, and the sixth to focus on the character of Sam Vimes. Pratchett felt the book was closer to Discworld novels like The Fifth Elephant more so than the first book, The Colour of Magic, believing the series had "evolved", attributing the series' success to its ability to change. Pratchett called the humour in the book "the humour that comes out of bad situations", comparing it to the humour of M*A*S*H. The contents of the book, such as the secret police and the torture chamber, meant that an abundance of gags would seem wrong.

Pratchett commented:

"The point was, if I had filled the torture chamber with the comfy chair and soft cushions from Monty Python's Spanish Inquisition sketch for a laugh, that would have been an obscenity."

The book's cover parodies Rembrandt's The Night Watch.

Paul Kidby illustrated the cover of British edition, with Night Watch being the first main-sequence Discworld novel not to have a cover by the recently deceased Josh Kirby. Kidby had previously worked on Discworld in The Last Hero, The Pratchett Portfolio and Nanny Ogg's Cookbook, establishing "[his] own 'look'" for the series. Kidby chose to parody Rembrandt's painting Night Watch, an idea he'd had since first reading Guards! Guards!, and talked with Pratchett about what characters to include. Kidby pays tribute to the late artist by placing him in the picture, in the position where Rembrandt is said to have painted himself. At the time, Kidby recalls being criticised for making the cover "too brown".

== Reception ==
Robert Hanks of The Independent drew attention to a "slight softening of the funny bone" and a "hardening of the issues" in the later Discworld books, commenting on a lesser amount of jokes per page in Night Watch. He criticised the book's slow start, but called the book intriguing for its "Chestertonian common-sense morality" and compared the events of the book to those of Bloody Sunday. The New York Times's Therese Littleton praised the book as "transcend[ing] standard genre fare with its sheer schoolboy humour and characters who reject their own stereotypes".

Michael Dirda commented (in a review which originally appeared in The Washington Post) that it

turns out to be an unexpectedly moving novel about sacrifice and responsibility, its final scenes leaving one near tears, as these sometime Keystone Kops, through simple humanity, metamorphose into the Seven Samurai. Terry Prachett may still be pegged a comic novelist, but as Night Watch shows, he's a lot more. In his range of invented characters, his adroit storytelling, and his clear-eyed acceptance of humankind's foibles, he reminds me of no one in English literature so much as Geoffrey Chaucer. No kidding.

Night Watch won the 2003 Prometheus Award, and came runner-up in the Locus Poll for best fantasy novel. On the suggestion of the book having "darker" themes, Pratchett responded:

A dark book, a truly dark book, is one where there is no light at the end of the tunnel. Where things start off going bad and carry on getting badder before they get worse and then it's all over. I am kind of puzzled by the suggestion that it is dark. Things end up, shall we say, at least no worse than they were when they started... and that seems far from dark to me. The fact that it deals with some rather grim things is, I think, a different matter.

== Adaptation ==
A five-part radio adaptation of the novel was broadcast on BBC Radio 4 from February 27, 2008, that featured Philip Jackson as Sam Vimes and Carl Prekopp as young Sam.
