= Snuff (Pratchett novel) =

2011 Discworld novel by Terry Pratchett

- First edition
- Author: Terry Pratchett
- Cover artist: Paul Kidby
- Language: English
- Series: Discworld; 39th novel – 8th City Watch novel (9th story)
- Subject: Characters: Samuel Vimes, Lady Sybil, Lord Vetinari, Cheery Littlebottom, Captain Carrot
- Genre: Fantasy
- Publisher: Doubleday
- Publication date: 2011
- ISBN: 978-0385619264
- Preceded by: I Shall Wear Midnight
- Followed by: Raising Steam

Snuff is the 39th novel in the Discworld series, written by Terry Pratchett. It was published on 11 October 2011 in the United States, and 13 October 2011 in the United Kingdom. The book sold over 55,000 copies in the first three days.

The book is the eighth City Watch story and is based largely around Commander Sir Sam Vimes. Pratchett emphasised that the word 'snuff' has "at least two meanings".

== Plot ==
Commander Vimes is persuaded by Lord Vetinari to take a family holiday at the Ramkins' countryside estate. As Vimes arrives in the countryside, he senses crime. At a dinner with all the local 'nobs', Vimes discovers the distaste the local people have towards goblins. He also meets Miss Felicity Beedle, a children's book author; and he feels that she has something she wants to tell him about a possible crime.

Vimes goes to the local tavern and is bullied by the blacksmith Jethro Jefferson, who despises the local nobility. After a face-saving fight, he agrees to meet with Jethro later on Hangman Hill. Lord Rust also approaches Vimes and tells him that he will not find any crimes in the country, warning him that he has no jurisdiction outside of Ankh-Morpork.

That night, Vimes and Willikins go up to Hangman Hill to meet Jethro, but instead find the severed finger of a goblin girl and lots of blood. The next morning, the local chief constable, Feeney Upshot, arrives at Ramkin Hall to arrest Vimes for the murder of Jethro, who has gone missing, with Vimes considered the most likely suspect. Vimes refuses arrest, instead mentoring Upshot to be a better copper.

Vimes and Upshot, led by a goblin named Stinky, find the goblins' domain in a cave. In the pitch-black cave, Vimes realises he can see perfectly in the darkness, a skill rewarded to him by the Summoning Dark (a demon that briefly possessed him in the novel Thud!). In the cave he meets with the goblin chief who leads him to a goblin's corpse, the same one that was killed on Hangman Hill. Vimes ventures further in the cave in search of Jethro, but instead finds Miss Beedle, who, because of adoptive goblin ancestry, spends her spare time teaching goblin girls how to read and communicate with humans.

Upshot and Vimes pay a visit to Mr Flutter; he is known as the 'local trouble' and seems to be involved in most crimes in the area. They capture Flutter, but he is unwilling to talk. Vimes notices a cellar in his house and enters it. Surrounded by darkness he is able to communicate to the Summoning Dark, who provides an account of what happened on Hangman Hill. Vimes confronts Flutter, who tells Vimes that the goblin-girl was killed by a Mr Stratford, a man working for Gravid Rust, the 'entrepreneurial' son of Lord Rust.

After Sergeant Colon is possessed by the ghost of a goblin child after finding an unggue pot (a goblin burial pot) inside a free cigar, parallel investigations by the Ankh-Morpork City Watch and Vimes lead to the revelation that goblins are being used for slave labour on tobacco plantations in Howondaland. Wee Mad Arthur of the Watch flies to Howondaland to investigate and finds the plantation, where all the goblin workers are dying or already dead.

Vimes and Upshot hear that more goblins have been taken and are being transported on the paddleboat Wonderful Fanny. Vimes and Upshot secretly board the boat just as a thunderstorm arrives, making the night pitch-black and the river laden with debris. Vimes, with the help of Stinky, frees the goblins who are trapped in the cargo holds. He also rescues the captain's wife and daughter from being shot by Stratford, who had been posing as an underling. A battle ensues between Vimes and Stratford when the boat once again lifts on the tide, giving Stratford time to escape. After Vimes comes round from a knock to the head he surmises that Stratford is not dead and will be back to finish what he started. The captain of the boat loses track of the river bends during the commotion and panics. Vimes's ability to see in the dark allows him to guide the boat to safety.

Vimes is knocked unconscious in the storm and wakes to find himself and the boat in Quirm, everyone having survived the night. Vimes discovers that the goblins, along with Stratford, have boarded the next boat to Howondaland. Vimes boards the boat, arrests the captain and frees all the goblins as well as a kidnapped Jethro, but Stratford is not on board.

Vimes returns to his family in Ramkin Hall and together they travel to Quirm on the pleasure boat Roberta E. Biscuit. Stratford attempts to attack Vimes's son but is defeated by Vimes and Willikins and handed over to the Quirmian gendarmerie, to be returned to Ankh-Morpork for trial. On the way the prison coach crashes, allowing Stratford to escape. However, shortly after he is met on the road and killed by Willikins.

Lady Sybil arranges a concert in Ankh-Morpork, inviting the Patrician, Lady Margalotta Von Uberwald, and the ambassadors to Diamond King of Trolls and the Low-King of Dwarves. The aim of the concert is to showcase the musical talent of one of the goblin girls taught by Miss Beedle. The dignitaries are so moved by the display they agree to enact laws which will grant goblins the same rights as other sapient creatures and protection under the law. Gravid Rust, due to his trafficking of troll narcotics, is disinherited and exiled to Fourecks (it is implied that Gravid is monitored (and possibly killed) by one of Vetinari's Dark Clerks). One year later, Vimes and Lady Sybil return to the countryside to attend a wedding, where he learns that the events of the novel have been turned into a novel, Pride and Extreme Prejudice, which is dedicated to him.

== Reception ==
In a review for The Guardian, A. S. Byatt noted that the book connected two different meanings of Snuff ("an old-fashioned stimulant to be kept in elegant boxes and snorted gracefully in society" and "arbitrary and unpleasant deaths"). Byatt also noted the "great deal of interest in bodily fluids, excretions and excrement" in the book. At the end of the review, Byatt called Pratchett a master storyteller, and said he was endlessly inventive.

Snuff won the 2012 Bollinger Everyman Wodehouse Prize and was nominated for the 2012 Locus Award for Best Fantasy Novel as well as the Prometheus Award.

Reading order guide
Preceded by I Shall Wear Midnight	39th Discworld Novel	Succeeded by Raising Steam
Preceded by Thud!	9th City Watch Story; Published in 2011	Succeeded by None
