= The Last Hero (Pratchett novel) =

2001 Discworld novel by Terry Pratchett

- Author: Terry Pratchett
- Illustrator: Paul Kidby
- Language: English
- Series: Discworld; 27th novel – 7th Rincewind story
- Subject: Fantasy clichés, Gods, Prometheus, spaceflight, the apocalypse; Characters: Cohen the Barbarian, Lord Vetinari, Rincewind, Leonard of Quirm, Carrot Ironfoundersson; Locations: Cori Celesti, Ankh-Morpork
- Genre: Fantasy
- Publisher: Victor Gollancz
- Publication date: 2001
- ISBN: 0-575-06885-X
- Preceded by: Thief of Time
- Followed by: The Amazing Maurice and His Educated Rodents

The Last Hero is a short fantasy novel by British writer Terry Pratchett, the twenty-seventh book in his Discworld series. It was published in 2001 in a larger format than the other Discworld novels and illustrated on every page by Paul Kidby.

== Plot summary ==
A message arrives for Lord Vetinari from the Agatean Empire, explaining that the Silver Horde (a group of aged barbarians introduced in Interesting Times, and led by Cohen the Barbarian) have set out on a quest. The first hero of the Discworld, "Fingers" Mazda, stole fire from the gods and gave it to mankind (analogous to Prometheus), and was chained to a rock to be torn open daily by a giant eagle as punishment. Disillusioned with how their lives have turned out, the Silver Horde seek to return fire to the gods with interest, in the form of a large sled packed with explosive Agatean Thunder Clay. They plan to blow up the gods at their mountain home, Cori Celesti. They have kidnapped a bard so that he can write the saga of their quest. Along the way, they are joined by Evil Harry Dread (the last Dark Lord) and Vena the Raven-haired (an elderly heroine who has now gone grey).

The Wizards of Unseen University explain to Lord Vetinari that blowing up Cori Celesti will destroy the Discworld by temporarily disrupting the Disc's magical field (the only thing holding the Disc together), so Vetinari organises an effort to stop the Horde. Since the Horde is already near the centre of the Discworld and the home of the gods, speed is of the essence. Vetinari recruits Leonard of Quirm, who designs the Discworld's second known spacecraft to slingshot under the Discworld and back around the top, landing on Cori Celesti.

The vessel, named the Kite by Leonard, can carry only three people. Leonard of Quirm, Captain Carrot Ironfoundersson, and Rincewind volunteer for the mission (although Rincewind volunteers reluctantly, believing that he would have wound up going on the mission in any case, either by being forced to go or whilst trying to run away). The Librarian accidentally stows away, having fallen asleep behind some crates of equipment while loading the Kite. After a few mishaps, including landing on the moon (to replenish their oxygen supply) and nearly having their swamp dragon powered spaceship explode on them, they crash in a spectacular fashion into the main gate of Cori Celesti.

Meanwhile, the Horde have already reached Cori Celesti. The gods allow them to sneak in disguised as gods themselves, despite (or perhaps because of) their having been betrayed to the gods by Evil Harry. The Horde suspect that the gods have been manipulating their entire quest. Fate challenges Cohen to roll a 7 on a standard 6-sided die. Cohen cheats Fate by slicing the die in half in mid-air with his sword; the two halves land with the 6 and 1 both facing up. Cohen also notes that even if he does not succeed in killing the gods, someone will have tried, so someone will eventually try harder.

Captain Carrot attempts to arrest the Horde, at which point the Horde arms the explosives. While initially intending to attack him, the Horde realise that as a single brave man outnumbered by his foes and trying to save the world, Carrot is a Hero (and probably a king in disguise), and so their defeat is certain. After Rincewind explains that the detonation will destroy the entire Discworld, the Horde grab the explosives and throw them (and themselves) off the mountain.

As punishment for creating the Kite and for not expressing belief in the gods, Leonard is ordered by the gods to paint the entire ceiling of the Temple of Small Gods with a spectacular mural of the whole world (despite Blind Io saying he would be satisfied with "a nice duck-egg blue with a few stars"). They impose a time limit of 10 years on the task (Leonard finishes the task in a few weeks). Carrot asks for a boon to allow for the repairs of the Kite so that they can return to Ankh-Morpork. Rincewind asks for a blue balloon and the Librarian asks for some library supplies (and a red balloon).

The Horde's end is ambiguous. Valkyries come to take the heroes to the Halls of the Slain, where a feast has been prepared for them. Instead, the Silver Horde, refusing to accept their deaths, steal the valkyries' horses and set off to find other worlds to "do heroic stuff in". Death does not appear to them, as he often does when Discworld characters die, although he subsequently appears to Vena, and is evasive about whether he is "collecting".

After the Horde leave with the Valkyries' horses, their first stop is to visit Mazda where he is being punished, cut off his chains, give him something to drink, and leave him a sword so that he may deal with his punisher. The bard, changed by his experience, composes a new style of saga, one with musical accompaniment, about it.

== Characters ==
- Cohen the Barbarian
- Carrot Ironfoundersson
- The Librarian
- The Minstrel
- Rincewind
- Leonard of Quirm
- Harry Dread (evil lord)

Reading order guide
Preceded by Thief of Time	27th Discworld novel	Succeeded by The Amazing Maurice and his Educated Rodents
Preceded by The Last Continent	7th Rincewind; Published in 2001	Succeeded by None; Rincewind has cameos in The Science of Discworld and Unseen Academicals.
