= Jingo (novel) =

1997 Discworld novel by Terry Pratchett

- First edition
- Author: Terry Pratchett
- Cover artist: Josh Kirby
- Language: English
- Series: Discworld; 21st novel – 4th City Watch novel (5th story)
- Subject: War, diplomacy, jingoism, racism and xenophobia; Characters: Ankh-Morpork City Watch; Locations: Ankh-Morpork, Klatch
- Genre: Fantasy
- Publisher: Victor Gollancz
- Publication date: 1997
- ISBN: 0-575-06540-0 (hardcover)
- Preceded by: Hogfather
- Followed by: The Last Continent

Jingo is a fantasy novel by British writer Terry Pratchett, the 21st book in his Discworld series. It was published in 1997. The title refers to the concept of jingoism.

== Plot ==
The island of Leshp, which had been submerged under the Circle Sea for centuries, rises to the surface. Its position, exactly halfway between Ankh-Morpork and Al Khali (the capital of Klatch), makes the island a powerful strategical point for whoever lays claim to it, which both cities do.

In Ankh-Morpork, a Klatchian prince named Khufurah is parading through Ankh-Morpork, where he will be presented with a degree in Sweet Fanny Adams (Doctorum Adamus cum Flabello Dulci), but is wounded in an assassination attempt. Sir Samuel Vimes, Commander of the Ankh-Morpork City Watch, suspects both a Klatchian named 71-Hour Ahmed and a senior Morporkian peer, Lord Rust, of involvement.

The attempted assassination breaks off relations between Ankh-Morpork and Klatch as Prince Khufurah's brother, Prince Cadram, effectively declares war on the city of Ankh-Morpork. At this point, Havelock Vetinari, Patrician of Ankh-Morpork, resigns and Lord Rust takes command of the city. Vetinari refused to become involved in the war with Klatch since Ankh-Morpork does not have an army, but Rust declares martial law and orders the city's noble families to revive their old private regiments.

Vimes, refusing to follow Rust, stands down as Commander of the Watch. Captain Carrot resigns as well, as do Sergeant Colon, Sergeant Detritus and Corporal Angua. Vimes then recruits the Watch into his own private army regiment, reasoning that, as an official noble, he is entitled to do so by law and by Lord Rust's command, with the group remaining independent as knights legally fall under command of the king or his duly appointed representatives, neither of which exist in Ankh-Morpork.

Angua, following 71-Hour Ahmed, is captured by the Klatchians and taken to Klatch. Carrot, rather than rush off to save her, reports back to Vimes, who gets his private army to head for Klatch. Meanwhile, Nobby and Sergeant Colon have been recruited by Vetinari and his pet inventor, Leonard of Quirm, on a secret mission of their own, unknown to Vimes.

Vetinari, Leonard of Quirm, Colon, and Nobby end up in Leonard's "Going-Under-the-Water-Safely Device" and discover that Leshp is actually floating on top of a huge bubble of gas, and that the gas is escaping from said bubble, meaning that Leshp will ultimately sink back under the sea again.

Vimes catches up with 71-Hour Ahmed and has, by this time, figured out that Ahmed is a fellow policeman. Ahmed tells Vimes that Prince Cadram was responsible for the assassination attempt on Prince Khufurah. Ahmed and his band of Klatchian D'regs and Vimes' army head towards Gebra, in Klatch, where the war is due to start.

To blend in, Vetinari, Nobby, and Fred Colon get hold of some Klatchian clothing, though Nobby ends up wearing the costume of a dancing girl and gets in touch with his feminine side. The three head to Gebra, where they discover that Carrot has convinced the two armies to get together and play a game of football, Vimes is preparing to arrest both Klatchian Prince Cadram and Lord Rust for various breaches of the peace (such as being prepared for war), and 71-Hour Ahmed is supporting him. Vetinari prevents an international incident by the surrender of Ankh-Morpork and offering war reparations, to be ratified on Leshp in one week.

Vetinari is returned to Ankh-Morpork, under arrest and in disgrace, but as Leshp has vanished back under the sea again, the treaty was to be signed in a non-existent territory and thus the charge of treason is invalid. Seeing he has been tricked, and with the people and generals turning against him, Prince Cadram flees, with 71-Hour Ahmed in pursuit. His brother Khufurah recovers and assumes control of Klatch. Vimes is informed that Vetinari has been "reminded" that the old rank of Commander was the same as the old rank of Duke. He objects, claiming that only a King can make a Duke, but then realises that Carrot, secretly the heir to the throne, was speaking to Vetinari. However, Vimes later attempts to get out of his own investiture ceremony half-way through by giving chase to an apprentice thief.

Through the ramblings of Vimes' malfunctioning "dis-organiser", it is revealed that in another timeline, where Vimes chose to stay in Ankh-Morpork rather than attempt to rescue Angua, Klatch ended up invading the city, resulting in the deaths of the entire Watch.

== Characters ==
- 71-Hour Ahmed
- Angua
- Prince Cadram
- Fred Colon
- Detritus
- Lt Hornett
- Carrot Ironfoundersson
- Cheery Littlebottom
- Nobby Nobbs
- Leonard of Quirm
- Lord Rust
- Reg Shoe
- Havelock Vetinari
- Samuel Vimes

== Reception ==
In Interzone, John Clute described Jingo as fitting "seamlessly" into the Discworld, commenting that it does not "dishonour its predecessors in the series" and "is in fact better than most of them". Clute also compared Pratchett's writing to that of P. G. Wodehouse, and noted the presence of "totemic moments", and of several scenes which he felt to be "homilies".

Escape Pod stated that a significant portion of the plot is "Vimes subverting the status quo in ways that shouldn't work, but somehow do anyway". The SF Site ranked it "above Feet of Clay but not quite as good as Guards! Guards!", considering that "The story stumbles a bit, especially once the action moves to Klatch, and there are few nitpicky things here and there", but concluding that it is nonetheless "a fine addition" to the Discworld.

Reading order guide
Preceded by Hogfather	21st Discworld Novel	Succeeded by The Last Continent
Preceded by Feet of Clay	5th City Watch Story; Published in 1997	Succeeded by The Fifth Elephant
