= The Fifth Elephant =

1999 Discworld novel by Terry Pratchett

- First edition
- Author: Terry Pratchett
- Cover artist: Josh Kirby
- Language: English
- Series: Discworld; 24th novel – 5th City Watch novel (6th story)
- Subject: Diplomacy, conspiracies, vampires, werewolves, Ship of Theseus; Characters: Samuel Vimes, Ankh-Morpork City Watch; Locations: Überwald
- Genre: Fantasy
- Publisher: Doubleday
- Publication date: 1999
- Awards: Came 153rd in the Big Read.
- ISBN: 0-385-40995-8
- Preceded by: Carpe Jugulum
- Followed by: The Truth

The Fifth Elephant is a 1999 fantasy novel by British writer Terry Pratchett, the 24th book in the Discworld series. It introduces the clacks, a long-distance semaphore system.

== Plot summary ==
The Ankh-Morpork City Watch is expanding; there is now a Traffic department, and the clacks is replacing homing pigeons for communications between officers. The Watch is investigating the theft of the replica Scone of Stone (a parody of the real-life Stone of Scone) from the Ankh-Morpork Dwarf Bread Museum and the murder of Wallace Sonky, the inventor of preventatives.

Samuel Vimes, Commander of the Ankh-Morpork City Watch and Duke of Ankh, is sent to the remote region of Überwald as an ambassador to take advantage of the coronation of the Low King of the Dwarves to negotiate for increased imports of fat. Underground fat deposits are abundant in Überwald as a fifth Discworld-supporting elephant impacted there in prehistoric times, according to legend.

Überwald is the traditional home of the Disc's dwarves. The election of the "unknown quantity" Rhys Rhysson as Low King over the traditionalist Albrecht Albrechtson resulted from split opposition amongst various dwarf clans and the growing influence of Ankh-Morpork as the largest dwarf city on the Disc. A cabal of local werewolves seek to exploit this opportunity to destabilize the already deeply divided dwarf society. They instigate the apparent theft of the real Scone of Stone hoping to cause a civil war between traditionalist and progressive dwarves and isolate the country under the werewolves' feudal leadership.

In his capacity as ambassador Vimes meets the leaders of the local vampires, werewolves and dwarves, investigating the planned putsch along the way. Back in Ankh-Morpork, Captain Angua, alerted by Gavin, a wolf and old friend, learns that her werewolf brother Wolfgang is the head of the conspiracy and sets out to Überwald to stop him. Consequently, Captain Carrot also abandons the Watch and pursues her across the country, enlisting the talking dog Gaspode to follow her scent. Lord Vetinari appoints the incompetent Sergeant Colon as acting captain.

Colon becomes increasingly strict and paranoid, punishing members of the Watch for minor or imagined infractions. He also makes a number of speciesist remarks about troll and dwarf officers, leading officers to leave the Watch, with the number of Watchmen under Colon's command eventually dropping by two-thirds.

The Ankh-Morpork City Watch recover the replica Scone of Stone. It is undamaged, but they suspect that someone has made a replica of the replica. In response to Colon's refusal to pay the Watchmen (having burnt the pay chitty along with the rest of the mounting paperwork), Corporal Nobby Nobbs, who lost out on promotion as Colon's aide de camp, sets up the Guild of Watchmen with himself as Guild President. The other members of the Watch join and protest against Colon, but eventually it dwindles to just Nobby, Constable Visit, zombie Constable Reg Shoe and golem Constable Dorfl.

In Überwald, Vimes begins an unofficial investigation into the theft of the real Scone of Stone. He determines that the Scone was not in fact stolen, but destroyed in situ and its remains concealed by mixing them with the sand on the floor of the cave. Following an attempt on the Low King-designate's life, Vimes is wrongly imprisoned by the dwarves but escapes with the help of Lady Margolota, Überwald's most senior vampire. In the forest of the wintry countryside he is forced by Wolfgang into playing "the game", in which he must outrun the werewolves to survive. Carrot and Angua arrive just in time to save Vimes from the murderous pack.

Vimes' wife has been taken to the castle of Angua's werewolf family, so the commander and his entourage set out to save her. Managing to defeat the power-hungry Wolfgang, they are also able to restore the Scone of Stone. However, it is revealed not only that the Scone recovered is in fact the Ankh-Morpork-made copy, but that the Stone is periodically replaced. It is used to compel the Low King's 'Ideas Taster' (advisor) Dee to confess to his role in its theft and the assassination attempt, being driven by jealousy of Ankh-Morporkian dwarves being allowed to be openly female.

Back in their embassy, Lady Sybil finally manages to tell Vimes that she is pregnant, but the Morporkians are once more attacked by Wolfgang. In a stand-off, Wolfgang resists arrest and is killed by Commander Vimes with a Clacks flare. With the Low King's regalia returned, the enthronement ceremony finally takes place, and Vimes is granted prime rates for fat imports to Ankh-Morpork, thus fulfilling his original mission. As the Morporkian delegation leaves, the Low King implies that he is in fact female.

The book finishes with Carrot and Angua returning to Ankh-Morpork whilst Vimes and Lady Sybil take a second honeymoon. Carrot takes back his old rank of captain, returns Colon to his duties as a sergeant and orders him and Nobby to gather the rest of the Watch together.

== Characters ==
- Samuel Vimes
- Cheery Littlebottom
- Detritus
- Sybil Ramkin
- Inigo Skimmer
- Lady Margolotta
- Angua von Überwald
- Carrot Ironfoundersson
- Wolfgang von Überwald
- Dee
- Rhys Rhysson
- Gavin
- Gaspode
- Bum

== Reception ==
The Fifth Elephant was a finalist for the 2000 Locus Award for Best Fantasy Novel.

At the SF Site, Steven H Silver judged it as "not, unfortunately, a good starting place" for readers unfamiliar with Discworld and said that it "may be the weakest of the books featuring the City Watch", with the subplots involving Carrot and the officers back in Ankh-Morpork being "more entertaining than the portions dealing with Vimes," but emphasized that it is nonetheless "still a good novel" with a "well-written mystery".

January Magazine found it to be "richer than (...) Carpe Jugulum" and "satisfyingly similar to (...) Jingo", and noted its "violent and disturbing denouement".

Kirkus Reviews lauded it as "gloriously uproarious" and "satirical, devious, knowing, irreverent, unsparing and, above all, funny," while Publishers Weekly commended it as an "exuberant tale of mystery and invention" and a "heavyweight of lightness", which "skewers everything from monarchy to fascism, as well as communism and capitalism, oil wealth and ethnic identities, Russian plays, immigration, condoms and evangelical Christianity."

== Origin ==
In a 2000 interview, Pratchett stated that the novel had been inspired by his "finding whole novels in throwaway lines [from earlier novels]. Take Uberwald—a huge empire has crumbled, a lot of political certainties have gone, there are new alliances ... there are a lot of resonances there which I didn't realise existed when I put it on the Discworld map."

Reading order guide
Preceded by Carpe Jugulum	24th Discworld Novel	Succeeded by The Truth
Preceded by Jingo	6th City Watch Story; Published in 1999	Succeeded by Night Watch
