= The Truth (novel) =

2000 Discworld novel by Terry Pratchett

- First edition
- Author: Terry Pratchett
- Cover artist: Josh Kirby
- Language: English
- Series: Discworld; 25th novel – 4th individual story
- Subject: Newspaper journalism, Watergate; Characters: William de Worde; Locations: Ankh-Morpork
- Genre: Fantasy
- Publisher: Doubleday
- Publication date: 2000
- Awards: Came 193rd in The Big Read.
- ISBN: 0-385-60102-6
- Preceded by: The Fifth Elephant
- Followed by: Thief of Time

The Truth is a fantasy novel by the British writer Terry Pratchett, the 25th book in his Discworld series, published in 2000.

The book features the coming of movable type to Ankh-Morpork, and the founding of the Discworld's first newspaper by William de Worde, as he invents investigative journalism with the help of his reporter Sacharissa Cripslock. The two investigate the charges of embezzlement and attempted murder against Havelock Vetinari, and help to vindicate him.

The Ankh-Morpork City Watch characters also appear in this novel, but have limited roles and are seen mainly from de Worde's perspective. C.M.O.T. Dibbler also makes an appearance.

== Plot ==
William de Worde, black sheep of an influential Ankh-Morpork family, scrapes out a living as a scribe producing stock letters-to-home and a gossipy newsletter for foreign notables. After a team of dwarves arrive in Ankh-Morpork to start a printing business using moveable type, De Worde and the dwarves establish The Ankh-Morpork Times, later employing Sacharissa Cripslock and Otto, a black-ribbon vampire and iconographer. The Guild of Engravers aim to halt the 'non-guild' activities of the Times by cutting off their paper supplies and establishing The Ankh-Morpork Inquirer, a loss-making tabloid filled with fabricated stories.

The wealthy and powerful (but anonymous) Committee to Unelect the Patrician plot to depose Lord Vetinari. They hire Mr. Pin and Mr. Tulip, a pair of mercenaries known as the New Firm, to frame Vetinari and replace him with a puppet. Pin and Tulip manage to catch off-guard the normally impassible Patrician with Charlie, a witless Pseudopolitan Vetinari look-alike coerced into helping them. The plan goes awry when Vetinari's clerk Drumknott returns in the middle of the scene and the New Firm is forced to stab him and render Vetinari unconscious; their efforts are hampered by Lord Vetinari's terrier, Wuffles, who bites Mr. Pin and escapes, becoming the sole witness to the crime.

After William ill-advisedly advertises a reward for information leading to Wuffles' recovery, the New Firm, disguised as Omnian clergy, attempt to gather information about Wuffles from the Times but are frightened off by Otto's experimental dark-light 'obscurograph' technology (which unpredictably produces images of the past, the future or what is "really there"). Realizing that the job is much harder than their employers had initially suggested, the New Firm decides to skip town. They extort from their employers' zombie lawyer Mr. Slant their promised payment and a big "bonus" in jewels, using compromising voice recordings captured with a dis-organiser Mk II.

An anonymous tipster named "Deep Bone" helps William find Wuffles and "translate" his testimony, giving William the last pieces of the puzzle. Sacharissa accidentally discovers the New Firm's hideout in the de Worde family townhouse and is captured. The New Firm head back to the Times offices hoping to exchange her for Wuffles and silence all witnesses. In the ensuing struggle the Times offices catch fire. William and the others escape while Pin and Tulip hide in the cellar. Pin, driven insane due to the dark-light visions of the New Firm's deceased victims, kills Tulip to steal his potato (which he believed would allow him to reincarnate after death) and uses him as a raft against molten lead. Escaping from the cellars, he attacks William but is impaled on William's memo spike. William retrieves the jewels and the dis-organiser, and discovers Wuffles's bitemark on Tulip's leg. Blackmailing the Inquirer's staff, the crew borrow one of their presses to get the exposé printed.

The story clears Lord Vetinari's name before the Guild-controlled Patrician can seize power but the populace of Ankh-Morpork seem ambivalent to the news. From the recordings on the dis-organiser, William discovers that his father Lord de Worde, an ardent speciesist opposed to Vetinari's tolerance of non-human residents in the city, is the mastermind behind the Committee. He decides to confront him. A tense argument, blackmail with the threat of exposure, a fortune in jewels, and threats from Otto fail to intimidate Lord de Worde into returning to his self-imposed exile as William demands. However, after learning that his machinations nearly killed his own son, Lord de Worde admits defeat and walks away. William manages to blackmail Slant into providing his services pro bono to get him released from Watch custody and to resolve his dispute with the Engravers' Guild.

William is ambivalent about the new role of the free press but resolves that someone must tell the public the truth about what goes on in the city, even if the public is disinterested. The Times comes to be recognized, if not exactly welcomed, by the powers that be in the city, and William and Sacharissa make plans to expand even further. It is revealed that the regretful Tulip and the relieved Pin have been reincarnated as a woodworm and a potato, respectively.

== Characters ==
- Otto Chriek
- Sacharissa Cripslock
- Gunilla Goodmountain
- Mr. Pin
- Mr. Tulip
- Havelock Vetinari
- William de Worde
- Lord de Worde
- Mr Slant

== Reception ==
At the SF Site, Steven H Silver judged that Pratchett's decision to present the novel from William's viewpoint "infused (it) with a freshness that has been lacking from many of Pratchett's (then-)recent books". CNN called it "technically a fantasy novel, but an unconventional one. And a funny one — the laugh-out-loud kind of funny that comes along all too infrequently," saying that Pratchett was a "master at wordplay" and that the novel was full of "striking example(s) of linguistic gymnastics".

Infinity plus described it as an "excellently plotted tale of mystery and murder" and "an hilarious take on the newspaper business", its only fault being that the book's title was "descriptive" but insufficiently "fun".

Publishers Weekly considered it "Pratchett's best one yet", and noted parodic similarities to Pulp Fiction and His Girl Friday. MIT Technology Review observed that it "combines humor and political satire to great effect" and compared it to the work of Oscar Wilde, but felt that it relied too strongly on coincidence, that there was insufficient closure to some of the plot threads, and that "some of the dialogue tries too hard to be witty", ultimately concluding that although it may be "quite unfair to set [Pratchett] to higher standards than other [authors]", the quality of work he produced would naturally lead readers to have heightened expectations.

Reading order guide
Preceded by The Fifth Elephant	25th Discworld Novel	Succeeded by Thief of Time
Preceded by Small Gods	5th Individual Story; Published in 2000	Succeeded by The Amazing Maurice and his Educated Rodents
