= The Art of Discworld =

2004 book by Terry Pratchett

- First edition
- Author: Terry Pratchett
- Cover artist: Paul Kidby
- Language: English
- Series: Discworld; 2nd art book
- Subject: Illustrations of various Discworld characters Pastiches of famous paintings Characters Virtually all major characters, except the Discworld gods Locations Ankh-Morpork, Lancre, Death's Domain
- Genre: Fantasy
- Publisher: Victor Gollancz Ltd
- Publication date: 2004
- ISBN: 0-575-07511-2

The Art of Discworld is a descriptive book of the world of the Discworld as portrayed in Terry Pratchett's Discworld series. It showcases the art of Paul Kidby with descriptions of characters and locations by Pratchett and some details of the development of the art by Kidby himself.

The book details most major lead characters from the Discworld books and gives them background information, including how Pratchett visualises them and the inspiration behind them.

The cover shows the Mona Ogg, a fictional famous painting by the character Leonard of Quirm, which is a parody of the Mona Lisa based on Nanny Ogg.
