= Feet of Clay (novel) =

1996 Discworld novel by Terry Pratchett

- First edition
- Author: Terry Pratchett
- Cover artist: Josh Kirby
- Language: English
- Series: Discworld; 19th novel – 3rd City Watch novel (4th story)
- Subject: Cop novels, gender identity, slavery, robots and artificial intelligence; Characters: Ankh-Morpork City Watch, Havelock Vetinari; Locations: Ankh-Morpork
- Genre: Fantasy
- Publisher: Victor Gollancz
- Publication date: 1996
- ISBN: 0-575-05900-1
- Preceded by: Maskerade
- Followed by: Hogfather

Feet of Clay is a fantasy novel by British writer Terry Pratchett, the nineteenth book in the Discworld series, published in 1996. The story follows the members of the City Watch, as they attempt to solve murders apparently committed by a golem, as well as the unusual poisoning of the Patrician, Lord Vetinari.

The title is a figure of speech from Hebrew scripture (see feet of clay) and the script used in the book to represent Morporkian being written by a golem resembles the Hebrew alphabet, a reference to golems' origins in Jewish folklore.

== Plot ==
Twelve of the city golems, clay creatures forced to obey the written instructions placed inside their heads, decide to create a "king" golem in order to free themselves. They fashion a golem from their own clay and place in his head instructions that would fulfill their hopes: "Bring peace to the world", "Treat everyone fairly" and so on. They enroll the help of a priest and dwarf bread baker/museum curator to write the sacred instructions and bake the clay, respectively; Meshugah, the "king" golem, is initially sent to work in a candle factory.

Around the same time, a cabal of Ankh-Morpork's nobles and guild leaders seeks to gradually depose the Patrician and replace him with a puppet ruler. After Commander Vimes learns that Nobby Nobbs may be the heir to the Earldom of Ankh whilst visiting the Royal College of Arms (where he was told that the Vimes coat of arms was declared extinct due to his ancestor Suffer-Not-Injustice 'Stoneface' Vimes' regicidal acts), the cabal decide to declare Nobbs the new king since the Earls of Ankh were cousins of the last king, Lorenzo the Kind.

To implement this, the cabal orders Meshugah to make arsenic-laced candles and have them delivered to the palace. Vetinari is successfully poisoned, making him severely ill. Meshugah, however, due to being improperly baked and "overloaded" by all the different instructions his creators gave him, goes "mad": he starts overworking and, when he exhausts raw materials, he rampages through the city, and goes on to murder the priest and baker who took part in his creation. The golems that made him are horrified as murder violates their most base instructions and Meshugah was baked from some of their parts and is therefore “clay of their clay.”

At this point the City Watch steps in trying to solve the murders and the poisoning of Lord Vetinari. With the assistance of their new forensics expert dwarf Cheery Littlebottom (who gradually comes out as female over the course of the novel), Commander Vimes and Captain Carrot slowly unravel the mystery. The golems send one of their number, Dorfl, to falsely confess to the murders and the remaining eleven commit suicide. The cabal's plan fails after Nobbs, already despondent that there is no wealth to his new title, flatly refuses their offer of becoming king, partly on the general principle of never volunteering (as it normally entails onerous duties), and partly out of fear that Vimes would "go spare" and execute him.

Carrot and Dorfl, having been given a receipt for himself and thus owning himself and having no master, fight and defeat the golem king at the candle factory. Despite having his instructions removed, Dorfl is able to reveal that “words in the heart can not be taken” before dying, and is rebaked with a voice. Afterwards, Vimes confronts the city's chief heraldry expert, a vampire named Dragon King of Arms, who instigated the whole affair. Vimes suggests that Carrot, the rightful heir to the Ankh-Morpork throne, was too virtuous for the cabal, and the signet ring which 'proves' Nobbs' noble ancestry could have been stolen. While Vimes speculates that Dragon was motivated against Vetinari's laissez-faire attitude towards the city's social order (with elevated tradespeople having comprised the College of Arms' recent clients), Dragon implies that he wished to ensure that Carrot would not produce a part-werewolf line with Angua. Dorfl arrests him despite tenuous evidence and Vimes burns down the Royal College of Arms and all of its heraldic records as retribution against the "elite" and "noble" plotters, who had happily and self-righteously sacrificed the lives of several "commoners" in the pursuit of their scheme (namely an elderly woman and a baby from Cockbill Street, Vimes's childhood neighbourhood, who died after using poisoned candle stubs taken from the palace).

In the end, Vetinari has recovered completely, Dorfl is sworn in as a Watchman (to the chagrin of Ankh-Morpork's theological establishment), Vimes gets a pay raise, the Watch House gets a new dartboard, and Nobbs keeps secret his ownership of other heirlooms which could well prove his claim to the earldom (or which may have been acquired through theft). Vetinari reveals to his assistant, Drumknott, that he had already known of the plot for some time, having feigned his illness. Vimes' rash actions in the pursuit of truth had considerably scared the city elite, which is precisely why Vetinari had let him continue: so that the plotters would know just how much worse off they would be if Vetinari died.

== Characters ==
- Carrot Ironfoundersson
- Cheery Littlebottom
- Angua von Überwald
- Samuel Vimes
- Dorfl
- Fred Colon
- Nobby Nobbs
- Dragon King of Arms
- Meshugah

== Reception ==
Publishers Weekly described the book as "fantasy served with a twist of Monty Python, parody that works by never taking itself too seriously", with "sly puns" and "lively, outrageous characters". The A.V. Club, conversely, emphasized the book's "intelligent wit and wordplay with a notable lack of punnery", praised Pratchett for the "complexity" of the politics and the "three-dimensional" nature of the characters, and noted that the "sword and sorcery" plot "doesn't insult the reader's intelligence" despite involving "the bumbling City Watch" and "a murderous enchanted statue".

At the SF Site, Steven H Silver commended Pratchett for presenting "mysteries which can be solved with the clues provided", and stated that although the book does not have "quite as many laugh out loud moments as [previous Discworld novels]", it shows that Pratchett is "a novelist as well as a humorist".

Gideon Kibblewhite reviewed Feet of Clay for Arcane magazine, rating it a 9 out of 10 overall. Kibblewhite comments that "It's another gem from a master of comic fantasy."

Reading order guide
Preceded by Maskerade	19th Discworld Novel	Succeeded by Hogfather
Preceded by Men at Arms	4th City Watch Story; Published in 1996	Succeeded by Jingo
