= The Amazing Maurice and His Educated Rodents =

2001 children's novel by Terry Pratchett

- United Kingdom first edition
- Author: Terry Pratchett
- Cover artist: David Wyatt
- Language: English
- Series: Discworld
- Genre: Fantasy
- Publisher: Doubleday (UK); HarperCollins (US)
- Publication date: 1 November 2001
- Awards: Winner of the 2001 Carnegie Medal
- ISBN: 0-385-60123-9 (hardcover)
- Preceded by: The Last Hero
- Followed by: Night Watch

The Amazing Maurice and His Educated Rodents is a children's fantasy novel by British writer Terry Pratchett, published by Doubleday in 2001. It is the twenty-eighth novel in the Discworld series and the first written for children. The story is a new take on the German fairy tale about the Pied Piper of Hamelin and a parody of the folk tale genre.

Pratchett won the annual Carnegie Medal from the British librarians, recognising the year's best children's book published in the U.K. It was his first major award.

== Series ==
Discworld had been a comic fantasy series for adults, beginning with The Colour of Magic in 1983. Amazing Maurice was marketed as a children's book, to be followed in that respect by The Wee Free Men (2003, #30). It differs from earlier Discworld novels also by its division into chapters, though chapters become far more common in later books of the series. Contrary to the contrast between adult and child markets, reflected in catalogues, The Guardian observed on the occasion of the Carnegie Medal that "[t]he main audience for Pratchett's 48 books, all busily in print, is teenagers, who are drawn by his irrepressible invention and sense of mischief."

Maurice and his educated rodents were previously mentioned in the eleventh Discworld novel, Reaper Man (1991), although the characters in that novel are aware of the fraud perpetrated by Maurice and the rats.

== Plot summary ==
The book opens with Amazing Maurice (a sentient cat), a group of talking rats (the Clan), and the human boy Keith travelling in a mail coach to a small town called Bad Blintz. The group plans to enact a scheme they have used many times before, where in the rats pretend to infest the town and Keith poses as a rat piper to lead the "vermin" away for a small sum of cash. Although Maurice sees nothing wrong with this hustling business, the rats find it immoral, and convince Maurice that this town will be the last one they rob. Upon arriving in town, the group discovers that the people are convinced of a massive rat infestation, and have spent much of their savings on two rat catchers. Despite their efforts, food continues to disappear from the town. As the rats move into the town's underground, they discover an overwhelmingly large number of rat traps, but no live keekees (rats who cannot talk or think). Above ground, Maurice makes similar observations, including that many of the rat tails the rat catchers display as proof of their successful hunting are in fact shoelaces. Maurice and Keith meet the mayor's daughter Malicia and introduce her to the talking rats.

Malicia believes that the rat catchers are up to something and so she, Maurice, and Keith break into the rat catchers' hut. They discover a great deal of food stolen by the men and large cages where the local keekees are being bred for coursing. The rat catchers return and lock up the humans, taking away the rat leader Hamnpork who had met up with them. Maurice hides and feels a voice trying to enter his mind, inciting a great sense of fear. The rats of the Clan feel it too, and many become so afraid that they all but forget how to think and reason. Dangerous Beans, the rats' spiritual leader, is crushed by the realization that the rats are just mindless animals at heart, and leaves with his assistant Peaches. Darktan, the rats' trap expert, leads a group to rescue Hamnpork, and succeeds after nearly dying in a trap. Hamnpork dies of injuries sustained while fighting in the rat coursing pit, and Darktan reluctantly assumes leadership of the Clan.

Malicia and Keith, after freeing themselves, trick the rat catchers into admitting their crimes. The rat catchers have created a powerful rat king named Spider, which is the source of the mysterious voice that has been plaguing the rats and Maurice. Using its mental control over the rat catchers, Spider plans to wage war on the humans that created it. It sends the rats it controls to attack Maurice, Peaches, and Dangerous Beans. However, Maurice (so terrified that he stops thinking and acts instinctively) pounces on the rat king and destroys it. In his panic, Maurice also unwittingly kills Dangerous Beans. Maurice emerges from Spider's chamber carrying the body of Dangerous Beans. When he is safely out, he collapses and dies. In ghostly form, he sees the Death of Rats coming for Dangerous Beans and makes a deal with Death: two of his remaining lives in exchange for both his life and the albino rat's.

The rats corral all the keekees and block their ears. When a real rat piper arrives in town, Keith challenges him to a duel. The piper plays his magic rat pipe but none of the rats come out. Keith plays on a trombone and Sardines (an intelligent rat) emerges and dances for the crowd. Keith is proclaimed the winner, and leads the keekees out of town with the piper. After the piper leaves, the Clan rats emerge from hiding and tell the humans about the rat catchers' duplicity. The humans bargain with the rats: if the Clan will keep the keekees out of the town, the rats may stay and live as though they were just smaller humans. Keith decides to stay behind as Bad Blintz's ceremonial rat piper, while Maurice moves on to find a new scheme.

=== Characters ===
- Maurice – an intelligent cat who leads the group of rats. He is cunning and manipulative and has a very good (but cynical) understanding of how the world works. Late in the novel, he guiltily admits that he accidentally ate one of the intelligent rats of the Clan early in their history, and thus became sentient himself.
- Malicia – the daughter of Bad Blintz's mayor, perennially obsessed with fairy tales, having adventures, and storytelling.
- Keith – called the "stupid-looking kid", Keith is an orphan raised by the Musician's Guild. He goes along with Maurice's scheme mainly to have something to do, although he is very defensive of his rat family.
- Dangerous Beans – an albino rat who has acted as a kind of spiritual leader for the Clan since they became intelligent after eating rubbish from behind Unseen University. Darktan observes that Dangerous Beans is the Clan's much-needed philosopher, finding and "disarming" dangerous ideas for the group. For example, Dangerous Beans is the one who they all turn to for answers to questions of rat cannibalism, stealing, and the phenomenon of dreaming. He is also the interpreter of the rats' "bible", a children's book called Mr. Bunnsy Has An Adventure, which depicts rats and other animals living in harmony with humans, speaking and dressing like them. When Malicia observes that this book's utopian society is entirely fictional, Dangerous Beans and his assistant Peaches run off in despair.
- Peaches – a small female rat who acts as Dangerous Beans' assistant and the Clan's scribe. She is the unofficial carrier (dragger would be the more appropriate term) of the Thoughts, and Mr. Bunnsy Has An Adventure.
- Hamnpork – the aging leader of the Clan, leftover from before they could think. Hamnpork resists the idea of "thinking" and leads the Clan through the brute force and cunning that traditional keekees leaders use.
- Darktan – the leader of the rats' Trap Disposal Squad. After his near-death experience and the death of Hamnpork, Darktan becomes the Clan's new leader. Darktan, although an older rat, is much more progressive than Hamnpork. He is well-respected by all the rats because his knowledge of how to disarm traps helps keep them alive.
- Sardines – an older rat who wears a hat and tap dances. Sardines epitomizes the group of rats who harass the humans into thinking they have a full-blown infestation. He does not seek to lead but provides insightful help to Darktan after the latter becomes the leader of the Clan. He understands how to read both humans and rats and can manipulate both (but much more kindly than Maurice).

== Recognition ==
Karen Usher, who chaired the panel of Carnegie judges, declared that the selection was unanimous: "This is an outstanding work of literary excellence – a brilliant twist on the tale of the Pied Piper that is funny and irreverent, but also dark and subversive."

The Carnegie Medal for Maurice was Pratchett's first major award. The Guardian alluded to "16 years of disdain by the British literary establishment" and reported about his acceptance speech that he "rounded on" that establishment, "tilted at" Tolkien, and showed ambivalence about the fantasy label: "though his work dealt with profound themes, 'stick in one lousy dragon and they call you a fantasy writer'."

== Ideas and themes ==
All the rats' names derive from the words they have seen written on tins before they knew what the words meant, and they have called themselves whatever they thought sounded interesting. Pratchett puns on this, such as the doubting rat, who was called "Tomato" (as in Doubting Thomas).

== Adaptations ==
- BBC Radio 4 broadcast a 90-minute dramatisation on 23 August 2003, which was repeated on BBC 7 on 2 June 2007 and 27 April 2008. The character of Dangerous Beans was voiced by David Tennant. Darktan's voice was a spoof version of Sean Connery's Scottish burr. The narrator in the adaptation was Maurice himself, describing to Dangerous Beans how they arrived at the perilous situation near the end of the plot. Quotes from Mr. Bunnsy Has an Adventure, which appear as chapter heads in the book, were read by Rebecca Norfolk, aged 8, who played "Child reader" in the BBC Radio 4 production. To mark the occasion of Terry Pratchett's knighthood, it was broadcast on BBC 7 again, along with other dramatizations of his work, in February 2009.
- The book has been adapted for the stage twice: first by Stephen Briggs in 2003 and published by Oxford Playscripts, then in 2011 as a musical by Matthew Holmes, published by Collins Musicals. Both versions are designed for use in schools.
- In June 2019, a UK-Germany co-production between Ulysses Filmproduktion and Cantilever Media announced a CGI-animated full-length feature film adaptation, The Amazing Maurice with a of budget €15 million ($17 million). Terry Rossio closely adapted a screenplay from novel. The film stars the voices of Hugh Laurie — as the eponymous lead character of the streetwise talking ginger tomcat Maurice, — with Emilia Clarke, Himesh Patel, Gemma Arterton, Ariyon Bakare, David Tennant, Julie Atherton, Joe Sugg, Rob Brydon, Hugh Bonneville, David Thewlis, and Peter Serafinowicz cameoing as Death. The film's musical score was composed by Tom Howe with English singer-songwriter Gabrielle Aplin. It had its premiere at the Manchester Animation Festival on 13 November 2022 before going on to general release at the end of 2022.
- The same film production companies are putting together a CGI-animated feature film sequel to this film due for release in 2027.

== See also ==
- Mrs. Frisby and the Rats of NIMH
- Rat king (folklore)

Reading order guide
Preceded by The Last Hero	28th Discworld Novel	Succeeded by Night Watch
Preceded by The Truth	6th Individual Story; Published in 2001	Succeeded by Monstrous Regiment
Awards
Preceded by The Other Side of Truth by Beverley Naidoo	Carnegie Medal Winner; 2001	Succeeded by Ruby Holler by Sharon Creech
