= Ankh-Morpork =

Fictional city from the Discworld series

- Discworld location
- Ankh-Morpork City Arms
- Created by: Terry Pratchett
- Genre: Comic fantasy

In-universe information
- Type: City-state
- Locations: Unseen University; The Patrician's Palace
- Characters: Havelock Vetinari; Wizards; Ankh-Morpork City Watch; Sam Vimes; Moist von Lipwig

Ankh-Morpork is a fictional city-state that is the setting for many Discworld novels by Terry Pratchett.

== Overview ==
Pratchett describes Ankh-Morpork as the biggest city in Discworld and its corrupt mercantile capital. The city's motto is Quanti Canicula Illa In Fenestra, Latatian for 'How much is that doggy in the window?'

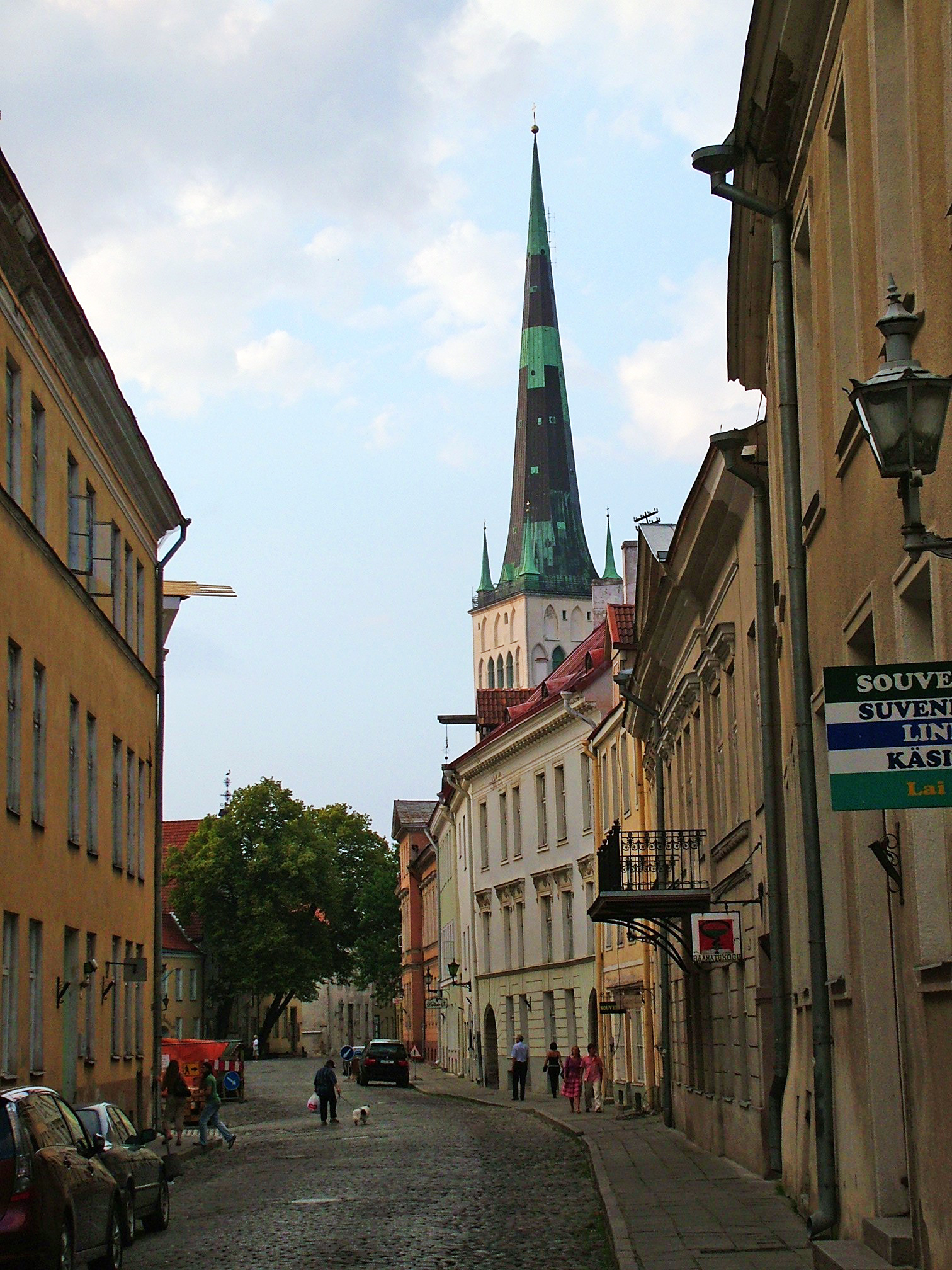
Tallinn, one of the real-life inspirations for Ankh-Morpork

In The Art of Discworld, Pratchett explained that the city is similar to Tallinn and central Prague, but adds that it has elements of 18th-century London, 19th-century Seattle and modern-day New York City. He also said that since the creation of The Streets of Ankh-Morpork, he has tried to ensure that the descriptions of character movements and locations in the books matched the Ankh-Morpork map; this allowed him, and fans of the series, to visualise the story more clearly.

== Administration ==
=== Government ===
The succession of the Patrician normally occurs by either assassination or revolution. Patricians have been known to resign, but this is very much the exception. Power is, to some degree, shared with the many Guilds and the surviving nobility. They form a sort of advisory city council, with a system of one man, one vote – the Patrician being the "one man" in question. According to The Truth, as per the city charter, a new Patrician must be elected with the unanimous approval of all Guilds.

=== Institutions ===
The primary engines of Ankh-Morpork's economy are the Guilds. There are hundreds of Guilds, for every conceivable profession, from clowns to butchers, and each has its own strictly maintained laws and trading practices. Many Guilds have assumed roles which in real-world cities would be assumed by government agencies, such as the Guild of Historians, comparable to English Heritage.

==== Assassins' Guild ====
Master Assassin Lord Downey, drawn by Paul Kidby

The Ankh-Morpork Assassins' Guild was widely considered by the elite to be the best option anywhere for a well-rounded education, regardless of intent to kill. Lord Vetinari received an Assassins' Guild education in his youth.

The Guild of Assassins is located in a light, airy series of buildings next to the Guild of Fools and Joculators, which, being a far more sinister building, is often mistaken for the Assassins'. The Guild was headed by Lord Downey.

===== History =====
The Assassins' Guild was founded on 27 August AM1512 by Sir Gyles de Munforte as the de Munforte School for Gentlemen Assassins. Sir Gyles was a warrior knight who, during his crusades in Klatch, was intrigued by the Klatchian tradition of professional gentleman assassins, and decided to set up a similar organisation at home, only without the drugs. In AM1576, it became a Guild and changed its name to the Royal Guild of Assassins. The "Royal" was dropped after the "events" of AM1688 (i.e. the Ankh-Morpork Civil War, in which the monarchy was overthrown).

It is said to be the only school of assassination on the Discworld, though the invention of organised assassination is said to have begun in Klatch, and it is stated in Interesting Times that there is a small, very select Guild in Hunghung within the Agatean Empire.

The unwillingness of the Assassins' Guild to accept contracts that might undermine the city led it to suspend contracts on both the Patrician and the Commander of the City Watch. This led to the rise of unlicensed assassins such as the banshee Mr Gryle in Going Postal and Mr Pin and Mr Tulip of the New Firm in The Truth.

==== City Watch ====
The City Watch is one of the great success stories. It originally consisted of the Day Watch, popinjays headed by Captain "Mayonnaise" Quirke (rich, thick, oily, and smelling slightly of eggs) and the Night Watch, three unemployable men: then-Captain Vimes, a drunk, Sergeant Colon, whose idea of major crime would be the theft of a bridge and Corporal Nobbs, who has a certificate to prove that he is probably human. The addition of Lance-Constable Carrot was the catalyst for their reform in Guards! Guards!. The Watch grew under the leadership of Commander Samuel Vimes to become the most modern police force on the Disc.

=== Economy ===
The AM$ (Ankh-Morpork dollar) is equal to 100 pennies (pence). The AM$ is reputedly the hardest currency outside of the Agatean Empire. A dollar coin is the size of a Venetian sequin, and although theoretically made of gold the metal has been adulterated so many times that, according to The Discworld Companion:

There is more gold in an equivalent weight of seawater. In a sense, then, Ankh-Morpork is on the gold standard in all respects except the one of actually having any gold to speak of.

In Making Money, deputy chairman of the Royal Mint Moist von Lipwig (acting under authority of the actual chairman, a small dog named Mr. Fusspot) sought to take Ankh-Morpork off the gold standard and make the Ankh-Morpork dollar a fiat currency backed by the economy of the city. And, inspired by the Ankh-Morpork citizens using stamps as currency, he introduced banknotes for multi-dollar denominations. Making Money "has often been highlighted as an example of Pratchett’s perspicacity, thanks to its superb depictions of the precarious unreality of banking systems."

== Demographics ==
=== Notable residents ===
==== The Canting Crew ====
The Canting Crew is an informal name for a group of Ankh-Morpork beggars who are too anarchic for the Beggars' Guild, which has a tendency to constrain them with rules. Members of the group can often be found beneath Ankh-Morpork's Misbegot Bridge and are normally accompanied by the talking dog, Gaspode.

Death joins the crew in the 16th Discworld novel, Soul Music where he takes the name, Mr Scrub. Death is successful at taking coin and enhancing the group's earning power where he also becomes known as the Grateful Death.

In The Truth, the crew are recruited by the Ankh-Morpork Times editor, William de Worde to become newspaper hawkers, where they capitalise on their unintelligibility to sell copies.

===== Foul Ole Ron =====
Excessively seedy, momentously dirty, overpoweringly smelly and entirely incomprehensible, Foul Ole Ron is the best-known member of the crew. He is often accompanied by Gaspode, the world's only thinking-brain dog (as opposed to a 'seeing-eye dog'). Ron's smell has become strong enough to not only melt earwax but to acquire a separate existence entirely — it occasionally arrives ahead of Ron and opts to stick around for a while after his departure.

Ron's 'catchphrase', "Buggrit, millennium hand an' shrimp...", was the result of Pratchett feeding a random text generating program with a Chinese takeaway menu and the lyrics to They Might Be Giants's song Particle Man. His catchphrase (minus 'buggrit') is also used by Mrs Tachyon, a character in the Johnny Maxwell series, also by Pratchett.

Foul Ole Ron is in one verse of Sam Vimes's "City version" of Where's My Cow? that Young Sam enjoyed, but Lady Sybil Vimes disapproved of this version.

===== Altogether Andrews =====
Altogether Andrews is a mass of many personalities, none of them named Andrews with most having higher social status than Altogether. The Duck Man speculates that Andrews was once a mild-mannered psychic, mentally overwhelmed by the other souls. Andrews is generally regarded as one of the most consistently sane of the group, since at least five of his personalities can hold a sensible conversation with other people. The personalities 'voted' on whether to act as street vendors for The Ankh Morpork Times (in The Truth) and Andrews held up five fingers to indicate the outcome of his personalities' decision.

===== Coffin Henry =====
Sometimes spelt 'Coughin' Henry'. Coffin Henry has a habitual cough from which he gets his name, it is described as sounding 'almost solid'. Like Ron, he has a verse in Where's My Cow?, as adapted by Vimes to fit city life. In it, Henry goes "Cough, gack, ptui".

While Ron asks people for money to stop following them, Coffin Henry makes money by not going anywhere. People send him small sums to not turn up at their parties asking people to look at his interesting collection of skin diseases. He also wears a sign saying "For sum muny I wont follo yu hom".

===== The Duck Man =====
The Duck Man is the intellectual of the group, and in comparison appears relatively sane, he seems unaware of the duck that lives on his head and has little memory of life before joining the Canting Crew, referring to it as "when I was someone else". Possibly once rich and well educated at some time, he wears the tattered remnants of an expensive suit. As a boy, he "messed around in boats". Somebody apparently wants him dead, as the price on his head at the Assassins' Guild is $132,000, but there's a chance he put that contract on himself. The Duck Man appears in several of Pratchett's books, including Hogfather, Soul Music, The Truth and Feet of Clay.

===== Arnold Sideways =====
Arnold Sideways is noted for being completely legless, literally — a cart ran over his legs several years ago and he now gets around on a wheelbarrow, usually pushed by the Duck Man. He carries an old boot on a stick, so muggers desperate enough to try to rob the beggars often find themselves being kicked on the top of the head by a three-foot tall man.

==== Willie Hobson ====
Willie Hobson runs Hobson's Livery Stable, which stables, rents and sells horses. The Stables is a popular location for circumspect meetings. Hobson is a large man, who looks like a shaved bear, he has delivered his equine-brokering services to the great and good and others of Ankh Morpork.

Hobson's name may make one think of the real stable-owner, Thomas Hobson, best known as the name behind the expression Hobson's choice.

==== Mr Hong ====
Mr Hong never appears in any of the books, having died before the start of any of the stories, but remains an important part of Ankh-Morpork's collective memory. Several times in the stories a character is admonished to "remember what happened to Mr Hong when he tried to open the Three Jolly Luck Takeaway Fish Bar on the site of the old fish god temple in Dagon Street on the night of a full moon and a lunar eclipse at the winter solstice." This incident acts as a deterrent for Morporkians against meddling too much with the occult or supernatural or doing something else that is just as stupid.

Though it is never satisfactorily explained what happened exactly, in Jingo it is revealed that only his kidney and a few bones were found.

==== Doughnut Jimmy ====
Universally known as Doughnut Jimmy, Dr James Folsom is a highly proficient horse doctor that Samuel Vimes instructs to treat Lord Vetinari in the 19th Discworld novel, Feet of Clay. Human doctors, that is doctors for humans, do not have high success rates in the city, whereas Jimmy earns his living by making sure his patients who are worth thirty thousand dollars are still a good bet to pick up first place in the Quirm Steeplechase. Jimmy treats animals worth considerable amounts of money and faces considerable trouble if his patients die. A former jockey, Jimmy won a lot of money by not winning races and was highly skilled at achieving results.

== Geography ==
The name "Ankh-Morpork" refers to both the city itself, a walled city about 5 miles (8 km) across, and the surrounding suburbs and farms of its fiefdom. The city itself lies on the River Ankh, the most polluted waterway on the Discworld, which divides it into the more affluent Ankh and the poorer Morpork (including the slum-like "Shades"). Lying approximately equidistant from the cold, mountainous Hub and tropical Rim, Ankh-Morpork is in the Discworld's equivalent of the temperate zone.

Ankh-Morpork is built on black loam, broadly, but it is mostly built on itself; pragmatic citizens simply built on top of the existing buildings rather than excavate them out as the river flooded and the sediment grew too high. There are many unknown basements, including an entire "cave network" below Ankh-Morpork made up of old streets and abandoned sewers.

=== Real-world connexions ===
The town sign of Wincanton

Ankh-Morpork was twinned with the town of Wincanton in Somerset, in the south-west United Kingdom on the spherical planet Earth (known in the Discworld books as Roundworld) on 7 December 2002. The town is home to a shop called "The Discworld Emporium", which also doubles as an "Ankh-Morpork Consulate" according to the shop sign. However, for legal reasons, the twinning was not officially displayed on the road sign. Fans, however, added stick-on notices to some of the signs. In 2009, this was changed, and a new town sign prominently declaring the twinning with Ankh-Morpork and other Roundworld places was erected. Several streets in a new housing development in Wincanton have been named after Ankh-Morpork Streets, including Peach Pie Street and Treacle Mine Road.

"Discworld: Ankh-Morpork" was published as a board game in 2011.

=== Fictional connexions ===
Many details of Ankh-Morpork appear to have been inspired by Fritz Leiber's fictional city Lankhmar (although Pratchett has said "I didn't – at least consciously, I suppose I must say – create Ankh-Morpork as a takeoff of Lankhmar"); John D. Rateliff notes that Leiber's characters "the Gray Mouser and Fafhrd guest-star in the very first Discworld story, The Colour of Magic, under the pseudonyms of The Weasel and Bravd".
