= Paul Kidby =

English artist (born 1964)

Paul Kidby (born 1964) is an English artist, best known for his art based on Terry Pratchett's Discworld series of fantasy novels. Kidby has created the sleeve covers since Pratchett's original illustrator, Josh Kirby, died in 2001.

== Early life ==
Kidby was born in West London in 1964. He worked as a dental technician making replacement teeth, before becoming a commercial artist and then a freelance illustrator in 1986.

== Career ==
Death with a kitten. Art by Paul Kidby.
- https://substack-post-media.s3.amazonaws.com/public/images/025cd867-aafc-49c0-a679-da16a54eb126_599x720.jpeg

Between 1991 and 1995, Future Publishing employed Kidby and he helped design and paint more than 20 magazine covers. In 1993 he began work on Terry Pratchett's Discworld series. Kidby's Discworld art, and many descriptions by Pratchett of pieces, are included in The Pratchett Portfolio (1996) and The Art of Discworld (2004). He also worked and designed an illustrated The Last Hero, a Discworld "fable" and number-five bestseller in the United Kingdom, his "90 beautiful illustrations" described as "augment[ing] the impact of this vividly described magical world."

Kidby's art frequently parodies well known paintings such as the Mona Lisa by Leonardo da Vinci, Night Watch by Rembrandt (featured on the cover of Night Watch) and An Experiment on a Bird in the Air Pump by Joseph Wright.

In December 2007 Terry Pratchett used Kidby's Web site to announce he was suffering from early-onset Alzheimer's disease.

Kidby was painting the cover for The Shepherd's Crown, the last Discworld novel, when he heard that Pratchett had died.

In August 2016 Kidby released Terry Pratchett’s Discworld Colouring Book of black and white line drawings.

In 2023 the Royal Mail released a set of eight stamps featuring Kidby's artwork to commemorate the 40th publication anniversary of the first Discworld novel.

A jigsaw puzzle titled The World of Terry Pratchett using original artwork from Paul Kidby was published in October 2024.

== Personal life ==
As of 2016, Kidby lives and works in Dorset.
