= List of awards and nominations received by Terry Pratchett =

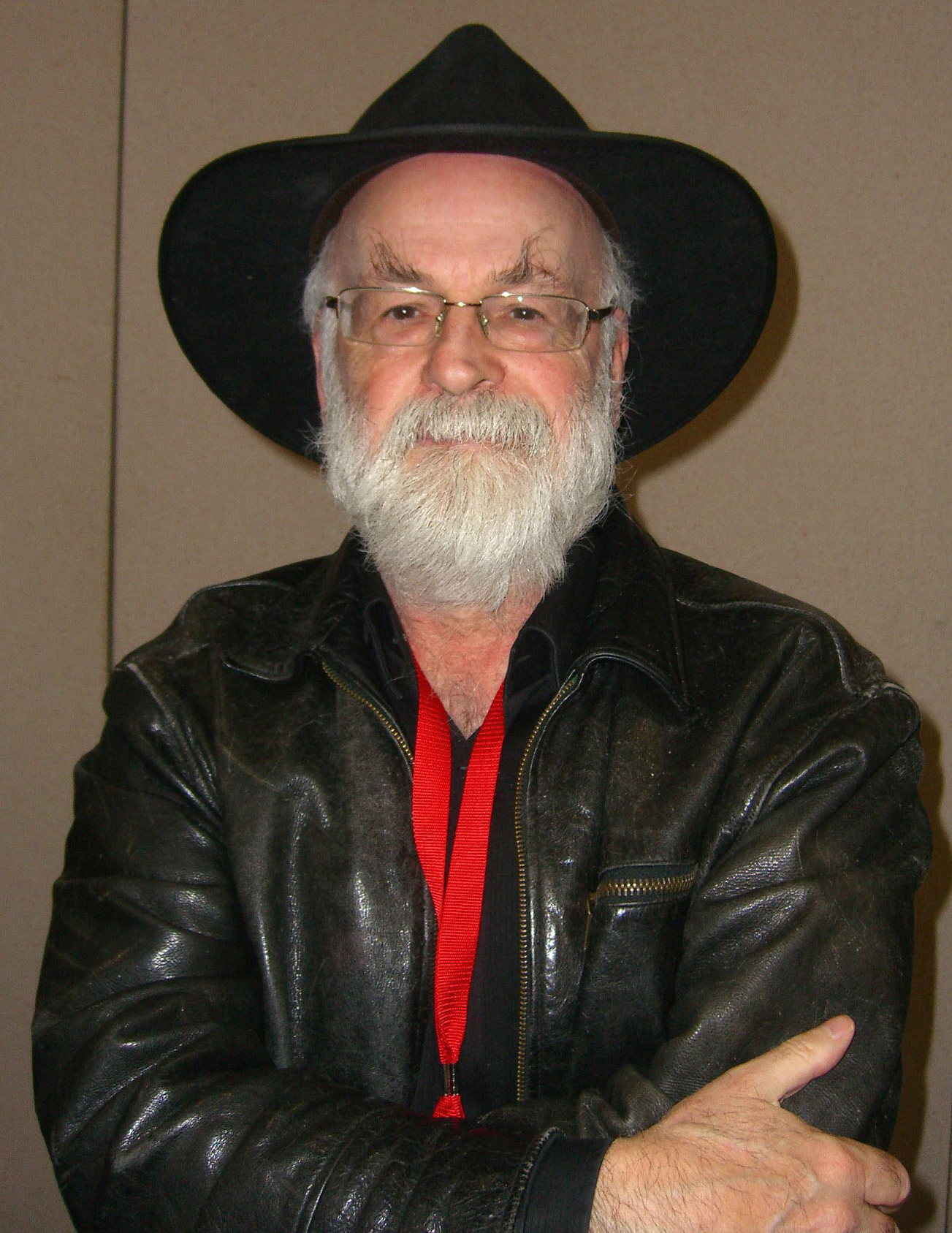
Pratchett in 2012

Terry Pratchett (28 April 1948 – 12 March 2015) was an English humorist, satirist, and author of fantasy novels, particularly comical works. He is best known for his Discworld series, which includes 41 novels.

== Literature ==
=== Career and lifetime achievement awards ===
Year & Award	Category	Result	Ref.
1989 Interzone Readers Poll	All-Time Best SF Author	28th Place	
1993 Guardian Children's Fiction Prize		Finalist	
1994 British Book Awards	Fantasy and Science Fiction Author of the Year	Won	
2009 Edward E. Smith Memorial Award		Won	
2010 World Fantasy Award	Lifetime Achievement	Won	
2010 British Book Awards	Outstanding Achievement Award	Won	
2011 ALA's Margaret Edwards Award		Won	
2011 British Fantasy Award	Karl Edward Wagner Award	Won	
2012 Forry Award	Lifetime Achievement	Won	
2015 Science Fiction and Fantasy Writers Association	Kate Wilhelm Solstice Award	Won	
2015 Eleanor Farjeon Award		Won	
2016 Science Fiction and Fantasy Hall of Fame		Induction	

=== Literary Awards ===
Work	Year & Award	Category	Result	Ref.
Mort	1987 The Dracula Society	Children of the Night Award	Won	
Mort	1991 Kurd Laßwitz Award	Foreign Work	Nominated	
Equal Rites	1988 Locus Award	Fantasy Novel	Nominated	
Wyrd Sisters	1989 Locus Award	Fantasy Novel	Nominated	
Pyramids	1989 BSFA Award	Novel	Won	
Guards! Guards!	1990 Locus Award	Fantasy Novel	Nominated	
Guards! Guards!	1998 Prix Ozone	Foreign Fantasy Novel	Won	
The Light Fantastic	1990 Kurd Laßwitz Award	Foreign Work	Nominated	
Good Omens (with Neil Gaiman)	1991 Locus Award	Fantasy Novel	Nominated	
Good Omens (with Neil Gaiman)	1991 HOMer Award	Fantasy Novel	Nominated	
Good Omens (with Neil Gaiman)	1991 World Fantasy Award	Novel	Nominated	
Good Omens (with Neil Gaiman)	2000 Premio Ignotus	Foreign Novel	Nominated	
Good Omens (with Neil Gaiman)	2012 FantLab's Book of the Year Award	Translated Novel/Collection	Won	
Good Omens (with Neil Gaiman)	2023 Audie Awards	Fantasy	Nominated	
Good Omens (with Neil Gaiman)	2023 Audie Awards	Audio Drama	Nominated	
Moving Pictures	1991 Locus Award	Fantasy Novel	Nominated	
Witches Abroad	1991 BSFA Award	Novel	Nominated	
Witches Abroad	1992 Locus Award	Fantasy Novel	Nominated	
Small Gods	1993 Locus Award	Fantasy Novel	Nominated	
Maskerade	1996 Locus Award	Fantasy Novel	Nominated	
Johnny and the Bomb	1996 Nestlé Smarties Book Prize	9-11 years category	Silver	
Johnny and the Bomb	1996 Carnegie Medal for Writing		Commended	
Johnny and the Bomb	1997 Guardian Children's Fiction Prize		Finalist	
Feet of Clay	1997 Locus Award	Fantasy Novel	Nominated	
Hogfather	1997 British Fantasy Award	Fantasy Novel (Robert Holdstock Award)	Nominated	
Reaper Man	1999 Prix Ozone	Foreign Fantasy Novel	Won	
The Fifth Elephant	2000 Locus Award	Fantasy Novel	Nominated	
The Science of Discworld	2000 Hugo Award	Related Work	Nominated	
Carpe Jugulum	2000 Lord Ruthven Award	Fiction	Won	
The Amazing Maurice and His Educated Rodents	2001 Carnegie Medal for Writing		Won	
The Amazing Maurice and His Educated Rodents	2002 Guardian Children's Fiction Prize		Nominated	
The Amazing Maurice and His Educated Rodents	2014 Geffen Award	Young Adult	Won	
The Truth	2001 Locus Award	Fantasy Novel	Nominated	
The Truth	2001 Prometheus Award	SF Novel	Nominated	
The Truth	2001 SF Site Readers Poll	SF/Fantasy Book	8th Place	
The Truth	2008 FantLab's Book of the Year Award	Novel/Collection	Nominated	
The Truth	2024 Prometheus Award	Hall of Fame Award for Best Classic Fiction	Won	
Thief of Time	2002 Bollinger Everyman Wodehouse Prize		Nominated	
Thief of Time	2002 Locus Award	Fantasy Novel	Nominated	
Thief of Time	2003 Audie Awards	Science Fiction	Nominated	
The Last Hero	2002 Locus Award	Art Book	Nominated	
Night Watch	2003 Prometheus Award	SF Novel	Won	
Night Watch	2003 Locus Award	Fantasy Novel	Nominated	
Night Watch	2011 Tähtifantasia Award		Nominated	
Monstrous Regiment	2004 Audie Awards	Science Fiction	Won	
Monstrous Regiment	2004 Locus Award	Fantasy Novel	Nominated	
Monstrous Regiment	2004 Audie Awards	Fiction	Nominated	
The Wee Free Men	2004 Locus Award	Young Adult Book	Won	
The Wee Free Men	2004 Mythopoeic Awards	Children's Literature	Nominated	
The Wee Free Men	2006 Utah Beehive Book Award	Young Adult	Nominated	
The Wee Free Men	2008 Geffen Award	Fantasy	Won	
A Hat Full of Sky	2005 ALA Awards	Best Books for Young Adults	Won	
A Hat Full of Sky	2005 ALA Awards	Selected Audiobooks for Young Adults	Won	
A Hat Full of Sky	2005 ALA Awards	Notable Children's Books	Won	
A Hat Full of Sky	2005 Locus Award	Young Adult Book	Won	
A Hat Full of Sky	2005 Mythopoeic Awards	Children's Literature	Won	
A Hat Full of Sky	2007 Pacific Northwest Library Association	Young Reader’s Choice Award (Senior)	Won	
A Hat Full of Sky	2009 Geffen Award	Fantasy	Won	
Going Postal	2005 Locus Award	Fantasy Novel	Nominated	
Going Postal	2005 Bollinger Everyman Wodehouse Prize		Nominated	
Going Postal	2005 Audie Awards	Fiction	Nominated	
Going Postal	2005 Quill Award	Science Fiction/Fantasy/Horror	Nominated	
Going Postal	2005 Hugo Award	Novel	Nominated (Note: Pratchett recused himself, stating that stress over the award would mar his enjoyment of Worldcon)	
Going Postal	2006 Nebula Award	Novel	Nominated	
Going Postal	2013 Tähtifantasia Award		Nominated	
Going Postal	2014 Geffen Award	Fantasy	Won	
Thud!	2006 Locus Award	Fantasy Novel	Nominated	
Thud!	2006 Bollinger Everyman Wodehouse Prize		Nominated	
Thud!	2006 SF Site Readers Poll	SF/Fantasy Book	7th Place	
Wintersmith	2007 Locus Award	Young Adult Book	Won	
Wintersmith	2007 British Book Awards	Children's Book of the Year	Nominated	
Wintersmith	2007 Mythopoeic Awards	Children's Literature	Nominated	
Nation	2008 Los Angeles Book Prize	Young Adult Novel	Won	
Nation	2009 Sidewise Award for Alternate History	Long Form	Nominated	
Nation	2009 Mythopoeic Awards	Children's Literature	Nominated	
Nation	2009 Odyssey Award		Honor	
Nation	2009 Michael L. Printz Award		Honor	
Nation	2009 Guardian Children's Fiction Prize		Nominated	
Nation	2009 Locus Award	Young Adult Novel	Nominated	
Nation	2009 Audie Awards	Middle Grade Title	Nominated	
Nation	2009 Boston Globe–Horn Book Award	Fiction & Poetry	Won	
Nation	2010 Carnegie Medal for Writing		Shortlisted	
Nation	2010 Geffen Award	Fantasy	Won	
Nation	2011 Premio Ignotus	Foreign Novel	Won	
Making Money	2008 Locus Award	Fantasy Novel	Won	
Making Money	2009 Nebula Award	Novel	Nominated	
Unseen Academicals	2010 Locus Award	Fantasy Novel	Nominated	
Unseen Academicals	2015 Tähtifantasia Award		Won	
I Shall Wear Midnight	2011 Locus Award	Young Adult Book	Nominated	
I Shall Wear Midnight	2011 Nebula Award	Andre Norton Award	Won	
I Shall Wear Midnight	2011 Mythopoeic Awards	Children's Literature	Nominated	
I Shall Wear Midnight	2011 Geffen Award	Fantasy	Won	
Snuff	2011 Goodreads Choice Awards	Fantasy	Nominated	
Snuff	2012 Prometheus Award	Novel	Nominated	
Snuff	2012 Bollinger Everyman Wodehouse Prize		Won	
Snuff	2012 Locus Award	Fantasy Novel	Nominated	
The Long Earth	2012 Goodreads Choice Awards	Science Fiction	Won	
The Long Earth	2014 Kurd Laßwitz Award	Foreign Work	Nominated	
Dodger	2013 Locus Award	Young Adult Book	Nominated	
Dodger	2013 Michael L. Printz Award		Honor	
Dodger	2013 Audie Awards	Young Adult Title	Nominated	
Dodger	2014 ALA Awards	Amazing Audiobooks for Young Adults	Won	
Dodger	2015 Premio Ignotus	Foreign Novel	Nominated	
The Long War	2013 Goodreads Choice Awards	Science Fiction	Nominated	
Raising Steam	2014 Locus Award	Fantasy Novel	Nominated	
Raising Steam	2015 Prometheus Award	Novel	Nominated	
The Long Mars	2014 Goodreads Choice Awards	Science Fiction	Nominated	
The Shepherd's Crown	2016 Locus Award	Best Young Adult Novel	Won	
The Shepherd's Crown	2016 Dragon Awards	Best Young Adult / Middle Grade Novel	Won	
The Long Cosmos	2016 Goodreads Choice Awards	Science Fiction	Nominated	
Tiffany Aching (series)	2016 Mythopoeic Awards	Children's Literature	Nominated	
The Discworld series	2023 British Book Awards	Fiction Audiobook of the Year	Nominated	

== Career awards ==
=== State ===
State awards
Year	Country	Honour	Citation	Ref.
1998	UK	Officer of the Order of the British Empire (OBE)	Services to literature	
2009	UK	Knighthood	Services to literature	

=== Academic ===
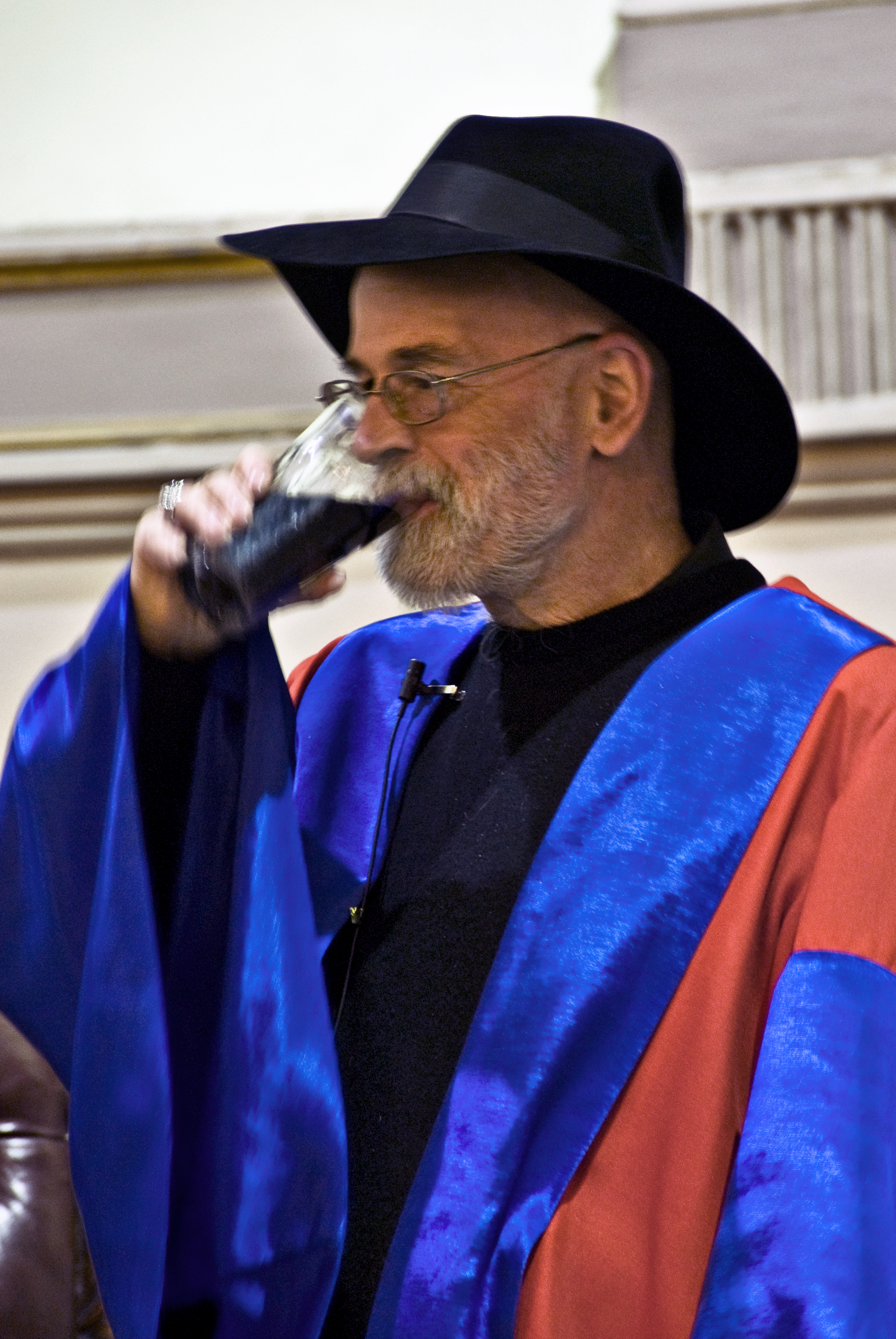
Pratchett drinking Irish stout shortly after receiving an honorary degree from Trinity College Dublin, in 2008

Academic awards
Year	Institution	Honour	Ref.
1999	University of Warwick	Honorary degree	
2001	University of Portsmouth	Honorary degree	
2003	University of Bath	Honorary degree	
2004	University of Bristol	Honorary degree	
2008	Buckinghamshire New University	Honorary degree	
2008	University of Dublin	Honorary degree	
2009	University of Bradford	Honorary degree	
2009	University of Winchester	Honorary degree	
2013	Open University	Honorary degree	
2014	University of South Australia	Honorary degree	

=== Miscellaneous ===
Miscellaneous career awards
Year	Organisation	Award	Ref.
2013	British Humanist Association	Humanist of the Year	
