= The Brick Moon =

1869 short story by Edward Everett Hale

- Short story by Edward Everett Hale
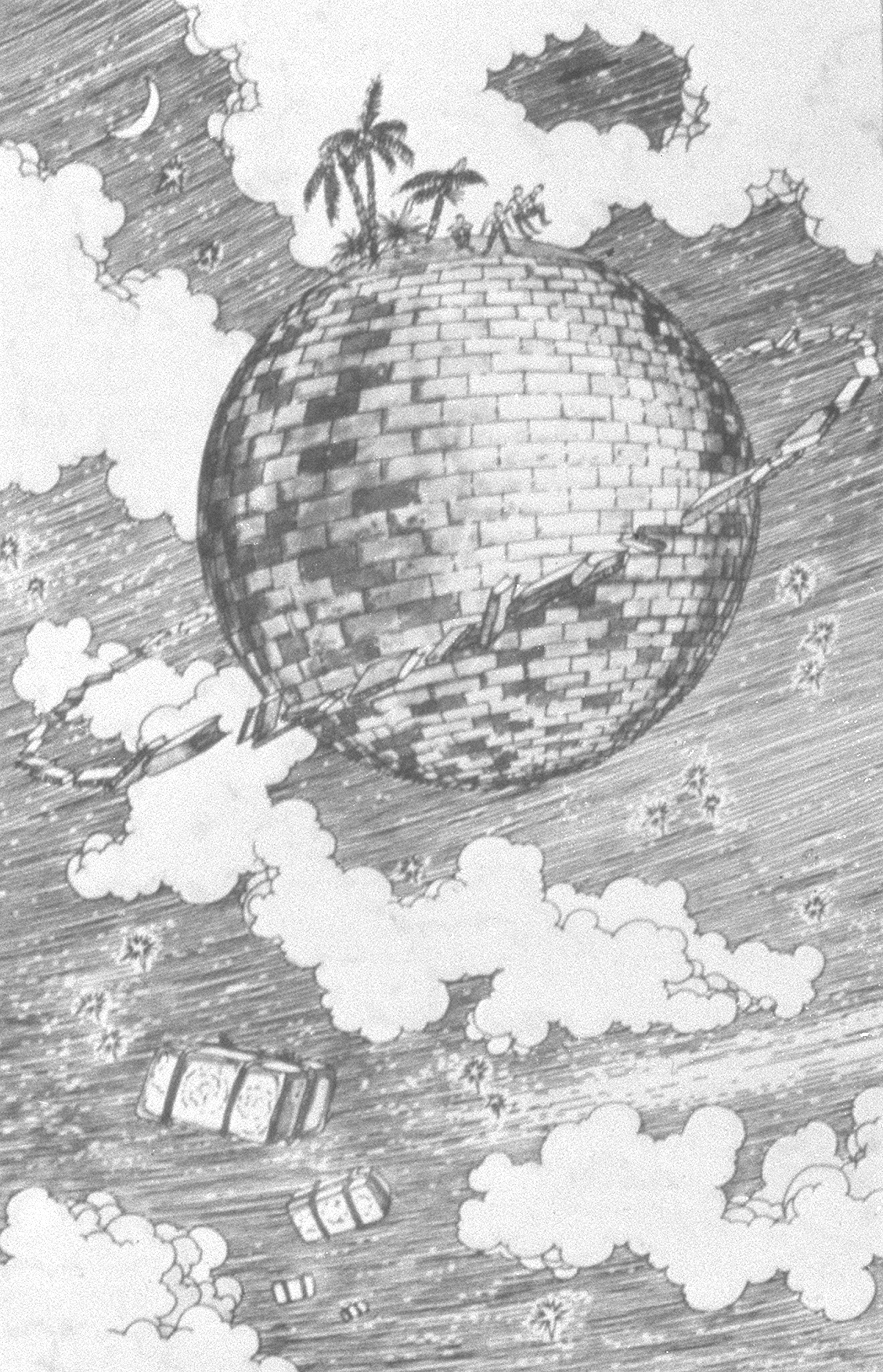
- The Brick Moon from NASA archive

Text available at Wikisource
- Country: United States
- Language: English
- Genre: Science fiction

Publication
- Published in: The Atlantic Monthly
- Publication type: Magazine
- Media type: Print
- Publication date: 1869

"The Brick Moon" is a novella by American writer Edward Everett Hale, published serially in the magazine The Atlantic Monthly in 1869. It is a work of speculative fiction containing the first known fictional description of an artificial satellite (though in 1728 a publication by Isaac Newton included a description of Newton's cannonball, a hypothetical artificial object which is projected from a mountain, as a thought experiment to explain why natural satellites move as they do).

== Synopsis ==
"The Brick Moon" is presented as a journal. It describes the construction and launch into orbit of a sphere, 200 feet in diameter, built of bricks. The device is intended as a navigational aid, but is launched accidentally with people aboard. They survive, and so the story also provides the first known fictional description of a space station. The author even surmised correctly the idea of needing four satellites visible above the horizon for navigation, as for modern GPS.

== Publication history ==
"The Brick Moon" was first released serially in three parts in The Atlantic Monthly in 1869. A fourth part or sequel, entitled "Life on the Brick Moon", was also published in The Atlantic Monthly in 1870. It was collected as the title work in Hale's anthology The Brick Moon and Other Stories in 1899.

== Influence ==
In 1877, Asaph Hall discovered the two moons of Mars. He wrote to Hale, comparing the smaller Martian moon, Deimos, to the Brick Moon.

In the Long Earth series by Terry Pratchett and Stephen Baxter a space station built in "The Gap" (where the Earth is missing) is named "the Brick Moon". It appears in two of the novels: The Long War (2013) and The Long Mars (2014).

The Brick Moon served as inspiration for a three-part musical by composer Matt Dahan as part of his musical radio series Pulp Musicals.
