= A Stroke of the Pen: The Lost Stories =

2023 posthumous book of short stories by Terry Pratchett

- Author: Terry Pratchett and his pseudonyms Patrick Kearns and Uncle Jim
- Language: English
- Genre: Fantasy
- Publisher: Originally published in serialized form in the Western Daily Press and Bucks Free Press newspapers between 1966 and 1984., Collected and republished as a book in October 2023 by Harper Collins.
- Media type: Book, Audio book
- ISBN: 978-0063376199
- Website: https://www.harpercollins.com/products/a-stroke-of-the-pen-terry-pratchett

A Stroke of the Pen: The Lost Stories is a 2023 posthumous book containing a collection of rediscovered short stories written by Terry Pratchett for the Western Daily Press and Bucks Free Press newspapers under his own name as well as under his pseudonyms "Patrick Kearns" and "Uncle Jim". Seventeen of the twenty stories were initially published between 1970 and 1975; of the three remaining stories, one is from 1966, one from 1967, and the last story in the collection is from 1984.

In addition to the short stories, the book features a foreword by Neil Gaiman, an introduction by Pratchett's agent Colin Smythe, and an account by fans Pat and Jan Harkin of the research they did looking for the serialised story, "The Quest for the Keys" (1984), which led them to uncover many of the other stories.

A subset of the collection, including "The Quest for the Keys" and multiple stories taking place in the fictional city of Blackbury are especially notable for containing some of the earliest mentions of Discworld places and characters, which Pratchett would later develop into his best-known series spanning 41 books.

The book was universally well received by critics, as an unexpected and welcome discovery of "new" writings by the deceased Pratchett. Critics noted that the author's characteristic witty and imaginative style was present in those early works, with the stories being praised for being well written, but without reaching the high calibre of his later works.

== Background ==
During his lifetime, Pratchett wrote 70 books (including the 41-book Discworld series) and had sales of more than 100 million copies in 43 languages, over 44 years of writing. He died in 2015 at the age of 66.

Upon his death he left three completed novels: the final Discworld book, The Shepherd's Crown, and the concluding two parts of The Long Earth series, a science-fiction project he had been working on with Stephen Baxter.

Pratchett was insistent that any incomplete works of his be destroyed after he died. He did not want people reviewing or publishing his notes and incomplete drafts. Following Pratchett's wishes, in 2017 his friend, business manager, and literary executor (and later biographer) Rob Wilkins drove an antique steamroller over a hard drive containing all unfinished Pratchett material (containing up to 10 incomplete novels).

Early in his career, Pratchett had been a journalist for multiple newspapers. Also, between the 1960s and 1980s Pratchett had published short fictional serialized stories in newspapers under his own name as well as under two pseudonyms: Patrick Kearns, and Uncle Jim.

In 2010 Bucks Free Press released an online anthology of 250 short stories by Pratchett originally published between 1965 and 1970. Also, collections of his adult short fiction (A Blink of the Screen) and non-fiction essays (A Slip of the Keyboard) emerged shortly before his death. A short story collection The Witch's Vacuum Cleaner was published in 2016. In 2020 what was thought to be the final volume of his children's stories, The Time-Travelling Caveman was published. It was believed that no additional works by Pratchett would posthumously emerge. However, at that point only the pseudonym of Uncle Jim was attributed to Pratchett, with Patrick Kearns remaining unknown.

== Origins and rediscovery ==
Pratchett wrote many short stories for the Bristol-based newspaper Western Daily Press, some under his own name, and others under the pseudonym Patrick Kearns in the 1970s and 80s. Prior to 2022–2023, this pseudonym had not been attributed to him, Pratchett having kept its existence secret.

Pratchett's publisher and later agent, Colin Smythe said: "For all the years I was Terry's publisher and then agent, he never ever gave me any help in finding his shorter writings – but as he wrote in his dedication to me in Dragons at Crumbling Castle, '[there were short stories Pratchett had] carefully hidden away and very deliberately forgot all about'." Further, Smythe noted his suspicion that Pratchett used pseudonyms as otherwise the at-the-time "honorable practice" of only writing for one newspaper would have prevented him from publishing elsewhere, since Pratchett was employed at the Bath and West Evening Chronicle.

One of Pratchett's serialised short stories was "The Quest for the Keys." Chris Lawrence first read it when he was 15 years old. It especially resonated with him, and he collected each part and framed them. “I treasured and kept them safe for more than 35 years; (...) having survived numerous house moves, little did I know of their importance.” In 2022 Lawrence realized that it was written by Pratchett. (Note: Unlike other of his short stories published in newspapers, Pratchett published "The Quest for the Keys" under his own name. However, some secondary sources suggest that Chris Lawrence was not aware of Pratchett's authorship of it, and it was by inference from the content and style of the story he concluded that it must have been Pratchett's work. These sources reported that Lawrence "connected the dots," realizing that "The Quest for the Keys" was written in Pratchett’s distinctive style; it had his trademark wit and satirical intelligence, as well as a blend of fantastical imagination and mundane modernity. It matched the tone of Pratchett's early Discworld novels, The Colour of Magic and The Light Fantastic. All sources note that the newspaper clippings Lawrence kept had been trimmed in such a way as to not include important bibliographical information such as the name of the newspaper and the date of publication.)

Upon this discovery, Lawrence contacted Smythe, who had not known of this story's existence. (Note: Some other sources say that Smythe reached out to Pratchett's estate instead of his publisher However, it is clear from the sources that it was Pratchett's publisher and agent, Smythe, who led the further investigation of this discovery)

The printed clippings Lawrence collected were trimmed in such a way that they did not include bibliographical details such as the name of the publication nor the dates. To find the original, unclipped, publications, Smythe turned to the couple Jan and Pat Harkin, retired doctors and fans of Pratchett. They became close to the writer in his later years, having met him at a fan convention. Pratchett would often call them up for anatomical advice when working on a book. The Harkins had honed their archival research skills in "fishing through medical records". On occasion they had helped Smythe track down some of Pratchett's earlier pieces from the near-by National Newspaper Collection in the British Newspaper Archive in Boston Spa, Yorkshire.

The Harkins set off to search for the original uncut version of "The Quest for the Keys". For months they delved into hundreds of back issues, in what i newspaper characterized as "an epic feat of literary sleuthing" by "a wife-and-husband team of amateur Pratchett-ologists", resulting in what The Guardian called the "rediscover[y of] the lost treasures".

"The Quest for the Keys" mentions the city of Morpork, otherwise first seen in Pratchett's first Discworld novel The Colour of Magic published in 1983. The Harkins thought that it was unlikely that Pratchett would have reused that city's name after the publication of the novel, estimating instead that the short story might have been published some time between 1972 and 1984. They decided to start their search from 1972 onwards, and go through four newspapers: Western Daily Press, Bucks Free Press, Midweek Free Press, Bath and West Evening Chronicle. They collected many short stories attributed to different authors for later assessment. Along the way they noticed that several written by a Patrick Kearns included the fictional city of Blackbury, which Pratchett had used in other works under his own name. This, plus another clue, helped confirm Pratchett's authorship: Smythe told them that "Kearns" was Pratchett's mother's maiden name.

The miscalculation of when "The Quest for the Keys" might have been published broadened the Harkins' scope of their research, allowing them to unexpectedly discover the other stories. The collection of stories that emerged was bought by Pratchett's long time publisher Transworld for a six-figure sum, announced in February 2023, and published in October 2023.

=== Reactions ===
Rob Wilkins said that the "rediscovery of these stories is nothing short of a miracle and represents the last 'new' Pratchett material we are ever likely to find". "Whilst Terry was always very focused on the next novel and maintained that his unpublished works should never be released, he always held a grudging admiration for his younger self's work, and he would be tickled to see these stories celebrated in one wonderful volume. The stories from the beginning of his career, before he became the Terry Pratchett we know and love, are no less inspired and give real insight into the development of his creative genius," said Wilkins. "He would be bemused at the joy that I am getting from them: (...) anything for Terry that took him away from the work in progress was a distraction. Yes, he would be delighted they'd been found. He would have a twinkle in his eye as well that it took us this long to find them."

Neil Gaiman called the discovery "a true treat".

== Contents and style ==
The book contains 20 collected short stories, originally published in serialized form in the Western Daily Press and Bucks Free Press newspapers between 1970 and 1984, under Pratchett's own name or his pseudonyms Patrick Kearns and Uncle Jim. These were characterized by Publishers Weekly as having "unearthed a treasure trove of Pratchett's early writing".

The book also includes a "touching" foreword from Pratchett's friend and Good Omens co-author Gaiman, an introduction by Smythe, and a concluding essay titled "The Quest for The Quest for the Keys" from the Harkins explaining their methodology and sharing their discoveries in recovering the stories from the archives.

There are characters ranging from gnomes to cavemen, ghosts to wizards, and hauntings of council offices, time-travel tourism, and a visitor from another planet.

The collection includes stories such as "Wanted: A Fat Jolly Man With a Red Woolly Hat" in which Father Christmas gets a job at a bank, and "The New Father Christmas" where Santa sacks his helpers in an effort to streamline his staff. Elsewhere, the Truman Show-esque "Mr Brown's Holiday Accident" tells of a man who discovers he is the main character in a continuously unfolding play, and "The Quest for the Keys", considered the best included story, features early mentions (Note: While it is more clear that the Blackbury stories (1967–1973) are the first mentions of elements of what would later become part of the Discworld, secondary sources have conflicting accounts as to whether "The Quest for the Keys" contains the very first mentions of the city of Morpork, a Rincewind-like character, and other Discworld characters. On the one hand, sources including the Library Journal and The Guardian assert that it is in this story that those first appear in Pratchett’s corpus. The Harkins, who searched for "The Quest for the Keys" in the British newspapers archive, also initially assumed that the original publication likely preceded the first Discworld novel The Colour of Magic, which was published in 1983. However, they eventually found that the short story was originally published in 1984, one year after the book. The Times among other sources also spoke to the fact that the short story was published after the book.) of Discworld's Morpork, a city from which a disreputable wizard sends a warrior named Kron on an adventure.

Transworld managing director Larry Finlay said that in the short stories Pratchett's fans would "spot nascent characters and settings that were to define his long career as one of the most exciting and inventive writers there has ever been".

Gaiman noted in his foreword that the stories are briskly written: "He has a certain amount of space on the newspaper page... and he's going to start, build, and finish his story to the [exact] word-count." Kirkus Reviews further notes that "there's not much space for character development or worldbuilding; these short fictions are essentially jokes, setups, and punchlines delivered efficiently, but with glimmers of the Pratchett charm. Several stories set in the fictional town of Blackbury have a genial, tall-tale feel, and the 'proto-Discworld' in 'The Quest for the Keys'."

=== Connections to Discworld ===
A subset of the stories in the book take place in an early version of what would become Pratchett's Discworld – the first book of which was the 1983 The Colour of Magic; "hint[ing] at the world Sir Terry would go on to create".

The Blackbury stories (1967–73) revolve around the Blackbury Institute of Applied Nonsense, a precursor of Unseen University. "The Quest for the Keys" (1984) contains an early mention of the Discworld series' Morpork. The story revolves around a proto-Rincewind facing a younger but still savvy version of Cohen the Barbarian set in a Morpork that has yet to be annexed to Ankh.

=== List of stories ===
The book includes 20 short stories:

- "How It All Began..."
- "The Fossil Beach"
- "The Real Wild West”
- "How Scrooge Saw the Spectral Light (Ho! Ho! Ho!) and Went Happily Back to Humbug"
- "Wanted: A Fat, Jolly Man with a Red Woolly Hat"
- "A Partridge in a Post Box"
- "The New Father Christmas"
- "The Great Blackbury Pie" (a revised version of “The Blackbury Pie”)
- "How Good King Wenceslas Went Pop for the DJ's Feast of Stephen"
- "Dragon Quest" (a revised version of "Dragons at Crumbling Castle")
- "The Gnomes from Home"
- "From the Horse's Mouth" (a revised version of "Johnno, the Talking Horse")
- "Blackbury Weather"
- "The Blackbury Jungle"
- "The Haunted Steamroller"
- "The Money Tree"
- "The Blackbury Thing"
- "Mr Brown's Holiday Accident" (Note: The fifth and concluding installment of "Mr Brown's Holiday Accident" was printed in the Bucks Free Press newspaper of 29 May 1970. However, due to a labour strike that day the newspaper was never sold. In consequence, the National Newspaper Collection in the British Newspaper Archive was lacking that issue. While the final instalment of that story was initially considered lost, Pat and Jan Harkin later discovered that the unsold newspaper was bundled and sold as part of the Bucks Free Press Midweek publication, and were able to recover that last instalment.That last instalment included a plot element that Pratchett would use almost twenty years later in his Discworld novel Mort (1987).)
- "Pilgarlic Towers"
- "The Quest for the Keys"

== Reviews ==
This collection of 20 short stories, republished in 2023, received positive reviews. The Times called them "unearthed gems", The New Scientist an "absolute must-read", and Publishers Weekly "excellent, often laugh-out-loud early works", adding that "Pratchett devotees will be moved and gratified by this unexpected gift and even casual readers will be utterly charmed. There isn't a bad story in the bunch."

Several reviews concurred in noting that these early works of Pratchett, while very much in his style, were good, but not up to the calibre of his later works. The New Statesman said that "his early work is wonderful, his later stuff is extraordinary," and that "Pratchett's short stories were never his best work ('They cost me blood', as he was fond of saying), but they always had charm and imagination." Kirkus Reviews said they "reflect an author in search of his craft". Similarly, The Guardian noted that "While some of these stories whizz by a little too fast, they nonetheless brim with the absurdist wit and inventiveness with which Pratchett would make his name. The book is a fascinating glimpse of a writer finding his voice." The Library Journal said that "the stories are very short and don't quite reflect the writer Pratchett became during the magnificent long run of the Discworld series, but the development of his authorial voice and the earliest seeds of what later became Discworld are there for readers who still miss his inimitable style."

The Independent said "This delightful collection is inventive, entertaining, and a little quirky, often with a twisty end. Imaginative stories include characters like Og the caveman inventor and ghosts that have been evicted from their home. Several characters and settings make later appearances in the novels that established his career. The comedic fantasies that shape this book make for a fun read. The wit, wisdom, and intelligence are interspersed with a lively dose of naiveté, with entertaining results." The paper gave it a 9/10 score.

The Times remarked that "Pratchett described his writing process as travelling through a mist-shrouded valley in which 'you can see the top of a tree here and the top of another tree over there'. He would head for the first tree, then the next, and, 'with any luck', make it across the valley. A Stroke of the Pen shows him at a stage when he was stopping at the first or second tree. Soon he would plunge into the forest."

Some critics commented on which audiences the work may be most suitable for. Kirkus Reviews said that "like any collection of juvenilia, for committed fans only, but there's plenty here for them to enjoy". Library Journal concluded that "fans of Pratchett (...) will love questing through these stories for bits of Ankh-Morpork." And i said that "the stories are enjoyable literary bonbons – written to a deadline by Pratchett, mainly for younger readers."

Multiple critics highlighted "The Quest for the Keys" as the best and longest story included in the collection. Discworld fans are expected to be interested in it, for having one of the earliest mentions of Discworld's Morpork and also characters that were early versions of the ones that would later appear in Pratchett's novels.
