= Strata (novel) =

1981 novel by Terry Pratchett

- First edition
- Author: Terry Pratchett
- Cover artist: Tim White
- Language: English
- Genre: Science fiction comedy
- Publisher: Colin Smythe
- Publication date: 1981
- Publication place: United Kingdom

Strata is a 1981 science fiction comedy novel by English writer Terry Pratchett. It is one of Pratchett's first novels and among the few science fiction novels he wrote, along with The Dark Side of the Sun, Only You Can Save Mankind, The Nome Trilogy and the co-authored The Long Earth.

Although Strata may take place in a different fictional universe and is classed more science fiction than fantasy, it could be said to be a kind of precursor to the Discworld novels, as it also features a flat Earth similar to the Discworld. It has been called a "pre-consideration" of Discworld, though the plot and characters are modelled on a parody of the novel Ringworld by Larry Niven.

== Plot summary ==
Kin Arad is a human planetary engineer working for "the Company", a human organisation that manufactures habitable planets using techniques and equipment salvaged from an extinct alien race who excelled at terraforming. The Company's function is to create dispersed branches of humanity after the human population plummeted. All planets built by the Company are crafted with artificial strata containing synthetic fossils, indistinguishable from real ones. On occasion, Company employees attempt to place anomalous objects in the strata as practical jokes, like running shoes and other out-of-place artifacts, hoping to raise confusion among future archaeologists when the planets' beginnings have been long forgotten. The Company forbids this, and secretly monitors the generated strata in order to detect embedded jokes, fearing such discoveries may collapse entire civilizations.

Kin is recruited to join an expedition with two aliens: a four-armed, frog-like "kung" named Marco and a bear-like "shand" named Silver. The expedition's leader, Jago Jalo, is a human who has returned from a relativistic journey over a thousand years ago where he discovered a flat Earth. When the team rendezvous with Jalo on the kung homeworld, he dies unexpectedly. Though Kin has misgivings about the expedition, Silver and Marco see the possibility of great technological rewards and launch the starship. When the expedition arrives, they find a flattened version of the medieval Eastern hemisphere of the Earth they had departed from. Clearly artificial, the disc rotates around its hub, and is contained inside a gigantic hollow sphere with tiny artificial "stars" affixed to the interior, augmented with a small meandering artificial sun, moon, and fake planets revolving around it.

Their ship is hit by one of the "planets" and lands on the flat planet. Hoping for assistance from the disc's mysterious builders, the trio head towards a structure they spotted at the disc's hub. En route, the team encounter the superstitious medieval inhabitants of the disc, who believe the end of the world is near, due to increasingly chaotic climate (caused by the disc's machinery breaking down), the recent disappearance of one of their planets, and the general devastation caused by the ship's crash. What Kin knows as "Reme" is called "Rome" on the disc, and there is a "Christos cult" completely unfamiliar to Kin. Also, Venus is conspicuously lacking its moon "Adonis", which dominates the sunset sky on the Earth Kin came from, which was formative in leading humanity to an early heliocentric world view.

The travellers eventually reach the structure at the hub and make contact with the disc's automated control systems. They are told that (aside from the recent damage) the sheer build-up of entropy in the old machinery has exceeded the capacity of its advanced robotic maintenance. Catastrophic failure threatens the disc's further existence. The machines offer to exchange their advanced technology for the construction of a real (spherical) planet as a refuge for the disc "Earth" inhabitants and Kin agrees. She is excited about the massive task at hand; Kin is over two hundred years old, and in danger of becoming tired of life.

The implication of the denouement is that the conventional planet Kin will build is in fact the readers' own "Earth". By the end of the story, Kin comes to the further suspicion that the builders of the flat world constructed the whole universe. The evidence of previous races would then be hoaxes, and the flat world itself would be a prank by the universe's construction crew – analogous to the artificial strata Kin and the Company manufacture, and the occasional prankster employees inserting hoaxes.

== Reception ==
John T. Sapienza, Jr. reviewed Strata for Different Worlds magazine and stated: "The most world-shaking concept in Strata is the cosmology. Humanity builds worlds to be colonized, complete with their own fossil history created by engineer/artists. But there's more – other races of world-builders existed before humanity, and before them were starbuilders, and before them were the stars that were themselves intelligent beings. A lovely idea, and one which the author tops at the end of the book! I highly recommend it."

Marc Burrows writing in The Magic of Terry Pratchett argued that a weakness of the book was that Kin Arad didn’t feel real which he blamed on Pratchett still maturing as an author.

== Reviews ==
- Review by Allan Jenoff (1982) in Science Fiction & Fantasy Book Review, #3, April 1982
- Review by Chris Bailey (1982) in Vector 109
- Review by Terry Broome (1988) in Paperback Inferno, #73
- Review [Swedish] by Tommy Persson (1988) in Månblad Alfa, 2 1988?
- Review by Michael J. Tolley [as by Michael Tolley] (1990) in SF Commentary, #68
- Review by Sue Thomason (1994) in Vector 179
- Review by Colin Steele (2001) in SF Commentary, #77
- G.M. The Independent Fantasy Roleplaying Magazine #2
