= The Carpet People =

1971 novel by Terry Pratchett

- First 1971 edition
- Author: Terry Pratchett
- Original title: The Carpet People
- Cover artist: Terry Pratchett
- Language: English
- Genre: Comic Fantasy
- Publisher: Colin Smythe
- Publication date: 1971, 1992
- Publication place: United Kingdom
- Pages: 199
- ISBN: 978-0-919366-14-5

The Carpet People is a comic fantasy novel by British writer Terry Pratchett. First published in 1971 and written when Pratchett was 17 years old, it was later re-written by the author when his work became more widespread and well-known. In the Author's Note of the revised edition, published in 1992, Pratchett wrote: "This book had two authors, and they were both the same person."

The Carpet People contains a similar mix of humour and serious topics like war, death and religion, which later became a major part of the Discworld series. Before creating the Discworld, Pratchett wrote about two different flat worlds, first in this novel, and then in the novel Strata.

== Plot of the 1992 version ==
The Munrungs are a small tribe living within the fringes of the Dumii empire. Their village is damaged by the Fray and they are attacked by Mouls riding Snargs. While fleeing they encounter Wights; a tribe that can remember both the past and the future. They then pass into the territory of a creature that turns people to stone. After rescuing King Brocando from the creature they are invited to his home city of Jeopard which they help liberate from the mouls. Jeopard is then struck by the Fray. A small group gets separated before being captured by the Mouls and taken to a copper mine on a penny. They escape with the help of a Thunorg; a Wight who can change the future.

A party from Jeopard sets out for Ware the capital of the Dumii empire. On the way they save a group of wights (a tribe that can remember both the past and the future) and the remains of the 15th Dumii legion. The wights had not expected to be rescued and they lose the ability to remember the future

They save Ware from a Mouls invasion after fighting a battle in the aftermath of a Fray strike. They win the battle thanks to the Thunorg changing the future causing thousands of weights suddenly appearing and attacking the mouls.

== Development ==
Pratchett claimed to have originated the term "carpet people" during an exchange at a pub. The phrase "The Carpet People" appears in one of his school notebooks in 1964. On 8 November 1965 while working at the Bucks Free Press he wrote a story featuring carpet people for their Children's Circle section. It was later republished with some modifications in Dragons at Crumbling Castle.

Pratchett showed a book length version of carpet people to its eventual publishers in December 1968 and a contract to publish was agreed 9 January 1969. Publication was delayed while Pratchett performed further polishing with 3000 copies of the book being released 16 November 1971. This version of the book included illustrations by Pratchett. These took a bit over a decade to sell out. A German version titled Alarm im Teppichreich was published by Verlag Sauerländer.

A sequel was considered but Pratchett abandoned the idea in 1973.

Pratchett heavily reworked the book before it was republished in 1992 with a print run of 133,000 and a cover by Josh Kirby. A 2009 version was released featuring the images from the 1971 version.

== Characters ==
- Glurk, chief of the Munrungs
- Snibril, Glurk's younger brother
- Pismire, the wise man of the Munrung tribe
- Bane, a Dumii general
- Brocando, King of the Deftmenes
- Fray, a natural phenomenon wreaking havoc on the Carpet
- Mouls, a power-hungry species
- Wights, who remember the future
- Camus Cadmes

== Themes ==
The book explores the conflict between traditions and innovation. There is an established civilization, complete with bureaucrats, taxation, and permits; there are people who resent the establishment; there is a need for both groups to find common ground in order to save their collective civilization.
