= The Long Earth =

2012 science fiction novel by Terry Pratchett and Stephen Baxter

- First edition
- Author: Terry Pratchett & Stephen Baxter
- Cover artist: Rich Shailer
- Language: English
- Series: The Long Earth
- Genre: Science fiction
- Publisher: Doubleday
- Publication date: 19 June 2012
- Publication place: United Kingdom
- Media type: Print (hardcover & paperback)
- Pages: 400 (Hardcover)
- ISBN: 978-0-06-206775-3
- Followed by: The Long War

The Long Earth is the first novel in a collaborative science fiction series by British authors Terry Pratchett and Stephen Baxter.

== Plot summary ==
The "Long Earth" is a (possibly infinite) series of parallel worlds that are similar to Earth, which can be reached by using an inexpensive device called a "Stepper"—designs for which are, one day in 2015, posted online suddenly allowing humanity to explore worlds "East" and "West" of "Datum Earth". The worlds are mostly familiar, though others differ in greater and greater details, but all share one similarity: on none are there, or have there ever been, Homo sapiens – although the same cannot be said of earlier hominid species, especially Homo habilis.

The book, set in 2030, deals primarily with the journey of 28-year-old Joshua Valienté (a natural "Stepper") and Lobsang, who claims to be a Tibetan motorcycle repairman reincarnated as an artificial intelligence. The two chart a course to learn as much as possible about the parallel worlds, travelling millions of steps away from the original Earth. They encounter evidence of other humanoid species (referred to as trolls and elves); of human settlers who learned their gifts early – including Sally Linsay, daughter of the inventor of the stepper, who joins them on their expedition; and of an extinct race of bipedal dinosaur descendants. They also encounter warning signs of a great danger, millions of worlds away from Earth, causing catastrophe as it moves. The book also deals with the effects of the explosion of available space on the people of Datum Earth and the new colonies and political movements that are spreading throughout the Long Earth.

A young girl, Helen Green, and her family (with the exception of her brother, Rod, who is unable to step) trek across the long earth to form a new community, Reboot, on Earth West 101,754.

After stepping across "The Gap" – a universe around two million steps from the Datum where the Earth no longer exists – Joshua and Lobsang encounter the threat that has caused the slow migration of Trolls away from the gap. First Person Singular is a being that absorbs other sentient life forms, eventually taking over everything on earth before stepping to the next. It currently cannot pass The Gap. Lobsang elects to stay in First Person Singular's universe and commune with it, in the hopes of convincing it not to advance further, or at least to not absorb all other sentients.

Joshua and Sally return to Datum Earth back the way they came. Upon reaching Earth West 101,754, they hear news that Datum Madison has been destroyed in a nuclear explosion, the result of a bomb planted by a terrorist group of humans incapable of stepping (called "phobics" in the book's terminology). The book ends with the two of them briefly seeing the explosion site, before retreating to Earth West 1 Madison, where a backed-up instantiation of Lobsang contacts Joshua by phone.

== Characters ==
- Joshua Valienté: an orphan, born on another world when his mother stepped during childbirth. A natural stepper. He is a loner, but demonstrates an altruistic nature early, rescuing children stranded or injured using early Stepper boxes.
- Lobsang: an artificial intelligence who claims to be a reincarnated Tibetan motorcycle repairman.
- Sally Linsay: daughter of the inventor of the Stepper box, a device that allows the majority of humans to step between parallel universes. A natural stepper and later romantic interest to Joshua Valienté. Like Joshua, she usually prefers the tranquillity of uninhabited worlds to the "noise" of Datum Earth and their close counterparts.
- Monica Jansson: A Madison Police officer who learns of Joshua when both are helping disappearing children on Step Day, the day when the blueprint for the Stepper Box is released on the internet.
- Helen Green: a young girl who sets off across the long earth with most of her family to start a new community. She keeps a diary of her travels.
- Rod Green: brother to Helen Green, a boy who cannot step and is left on Datum Earth by his family as they travel across the long earth. He later helps in the bombing of Madison where he is captured and imprisoned.
- Sister Agnes: a Harley-riding nun who looks after Joshua during his younger years at the orphanage.
- Douglas Black: founder of the Black Corporation, a high-profile research based weapons and technology company. Creator of Lobsang.
- First Person Singular: a being found on the far side of The Gap, more than two million steps from earth, that absorbs all sentient life.
- Mark Twain: an airship with a certain level of artificial intelligence granted by the Black Corporation and Lobsang, allowing it, and those within it, to step. The Mark Twain, named after the author, carries Joshua and Lobsang on their journey across the long Earth.

== Reception ==
Reviewing the book in The Guardian, Adam Roberts found it to be "much more like a Baxter novel than a Pratchett one." It was also said to be "a charming, absorbing and somehow spacious piece of imagineering."

The book reached 13th on The New York Times hardback best-sellers list on 8 July 2012.

The novel won the Goodreads Choice Awards 2012 for Science Fiction.

== Sequel ==
Sequels of the novel in the series are:

1. The Long War (June 2013)
2. The Long Mars (June 2014)
3. The Long Utopia (June 2015)
4. The Long Cosmos (June 2016)

== See also ==
- Bigfoot
- Living Space
- Paratime series
- The Merchant Princes
- Sliders
