= Space stations and habitats in fiction =

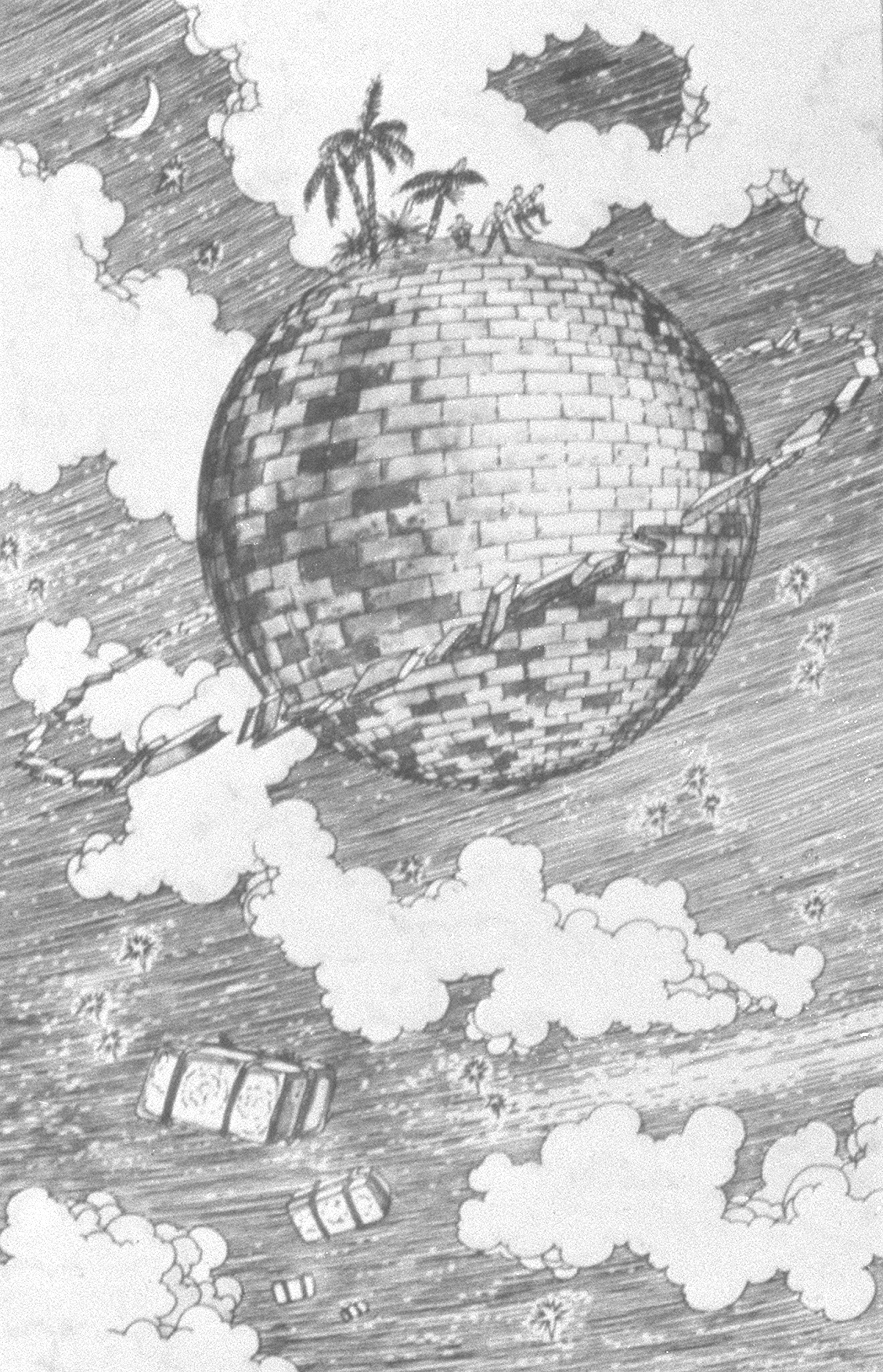
"The Brick Moon" – an 1869 serial by Edward Everett Hale – was the first fictional space station or habitat.

The concepts of space stations and space habitats feature in science fiction. The difference between the two is that habitats are larger and more complex structures intended as permanent homes for substantial populations (though generation ships also fit this description, they are usually not considered space habitats as they are heading for a destination), but the line between the two is fuzzy with significant overlap and the term space station is sometimes used for both concepts. The first such artificial satellite in fiction was Edward Everett Hale's "The Brick Moon" in 1869, a sphere of bricks 61 meters across accidentally launched into orbit around the Earth with people still onboard.

== Space stations ==
Space stations started appearing frequently in science fiction works following the release of the 1949 popular science book The Conquest of Space by Willy Ley, which deals with the subject. They serve several disparate functions in different works. Among these are industry, health benefits due to low gravity, prisons, and means to observe alien worlds. Several early works of the genre focused on space stations in Earth orbit or at Lagrange points as relay stations for interplanetary communication or transportation. Military uses for space stations appear, but being portrayed as a direct threat is comparatively rare. Occasionally, the space stations are connected to the planet they are orbiting via a space elevator, a concept which was introduced to science fiction separately by Arthur C. Clarke and Charles Sheffield in 1979. In fiction, space stations were largely superseded by space habitats in the final quarter of the 20th century.

== Space habitats ==
The first fictional space habitat proper (not counting the unintentional one in "The Brick Moon") was featured in the 1931 novella "The Prince of Space" by Jack Williamson; it is a cylinder 1,520 metres (5,000 ft) long and wide which rotates to create artificial gravity.

Besides cylinders, space habitats in fiction also come in the shapes of spheres, wheels, and hollowed-out asteroids, among others. A more unusual depiction is seen in James Blish's 1955 book Earthman, Come Home—as well as the rest of his Cities in Flight series—where they are cities roaming through space.

Space habitats featured only intermittently in science fiction until 1977, when Gerard K. O'Neill's speculative nonfiction book The High Frontier: Human Colonies in Space was published and went on to inspire numerous authors. The works inspired by O'Neill range from utopian to dystopian; the latter foresee a wide variety of problems with space habitats, including dilapidation while humans are still living there, vulnerability to sabotage, and the potential for a wealthy elite in space to exploit the inhabitants of Earth.

A recurring theme in these works is tensions between the inhabitants of the habitats and planet-dwellers. Inasmuch as they provide opportunities for telling stories of isolated populations with diverse cultures, space habitats serve the same function in space that islands serve on Earth in earlier speculative fiction, though some science fiction works such as the TV series Star Trek: Deep Space Nine and Babylon 5 take the opposite approach of portraying space habitats as multicultural centres where members of different spacefaring civilizations coexist peacefully.

== See also ==
- Dyson spheres in popular culture
- List of films featuring space stations
- List of fictional spacecraft
- Space dock
