= The Nome Trilogy =

Book series

The Nome Trilogy (The Bromeliad)
- The first edition set of the trilogy
- Truckers; Diggers; Wings
- Author: Terry Pratchett
- Country: United Kingdom
- Genre: Fantasy
- Published: 1989–1990

The Nome Trilogy, also known as The Bromeliad, is a trilogy of children's books by British writer Terry Pratchett, consisting of the books Truckers (1989), Diggers (1990) and Wings (1990). The trilogy tells the story of the Nomes, a race of tiny people from another world who now live hidden among humans. Through the books they struggle to survive in the human world and, once they learn of their history from an artefact known as "The Thing", make plans to return home.

Diggers and Wings are contemporaneous sequels to Truckers, as each book follows different characters through mostly concurrent events. Masklin is the central character throughout Truckers and Wings, while both Dorcas and Grimma serve as central characters in Diggers.

== Themes ==
Pratchett covered the idea of small people in some of his early writing, including his unconnected first novel, The Carpet People (1971/1992), about the tiny inhabitants of a household carpet, even smaller than Nomes. In 1973 Pratchett wrote "Rincemangle, the Gnome of Even Moor", one of many serialised children's stories for the Bucks Free Press, in his own words "an earlier and shorter version of what became Truckers".

The main theme in the trilogy is the struggle of challenging society's accepted beliefs in the face of new information. This theme recurs through the books and includes changes in the scientific establishment, political establishment, religious beliefs, accepted history and family values of the Nomes.

"The Bromeliad" was used as the title for the collected trilogy in the US, as well as some UK editions. It refers to the story told by Grimma in Diggers that some species of small frogs live their entire lives inside the flowers of epiphytic bromeliad plants, which is a metaphor used for the Nomes' experience throughout the books. The frogs themselves appear in Wings. The name is also a pun on Iliad and, according to the Annotated Pratchett File, The Belgariad.

== Continuity ==
References in the books - primarily that they are both set in the fictional town of Blackbury - suggest that they are set in the same world as Pratchett's Johnny Maxwell novels (1992–1996), which begin with Only You Can Save Mankind.

After being asked if he would write about the Nomes' return (as implied at the end of Wings), Pratchett replied that there could be another book about the Nomes. No such book had been announced as of his death.

== US version ==
Unusually for Pratchett's work, the books were localised. One notable difference between the US and UK versions is the earth-moving machine in Diggers, which is called "Jekub" (from JCB) in the UK version, "CAT" in some US editions and "Big John" in others. All three names refer to common generic trademarks for heavy equipment in their respective countries.

== Plot synopses ==
=== Truckers (1989) ===
Masklin, a 4-inch high Nome, lives in a grass verge by a motorway service station with his friend Grimma and the remaining elders of their once-large tribe, which has been dwindling due to food shortage and predation by foxes, while several Nomes have headed across the motorway. The other younger members of the tribe departed some time before to find a new place to live, but never returned after crossing the motorway, where they were inevitably killed by cars or lorries. Masklin, finding it increasingly difficult to find food for the group, formulates a plan to escape on a truck from the nearby service station, the final straw being when a fox runs into the path of a lorry after attacking two elder Nomes called Mr Mert and Mrs Coom, killing them both. The Elders, led by Granny Morkie and Old Torrit, initially oppose the move but finally agree, bringing with them 'The Thing', a small black cube that has been the tribe's symbol of authority for as long as anyone can remember.

The truck finally delivers them to the loading bay of Arnold Bros department store, where they are greeted by Angalo De Haberdasheri, an 'Inside' Nome. Angalo introduces the 'Outsiders' to his father Duke Cido de Haberdasheri, leader of the Haberdasheri clan, where they learn that most 'Inside' Nomes do not believe that 'Outside' exists, being contrary to the religion of Arnold Bros (est 1905), which states that 'The Store' contains 'All Things Under One Roof'.

Ejected from the Duke's presence, the Outsiders wander the underfloor corridors until 'The Thing' is accidentally dropped next to an electrical cable, where it starts to recharge itself. 'The Thing' then powers up and identifies itself as the navigational computer of the Galactic Survey Starship 'Swan'; the ship developed an engine fault many thousands of years ago, and marooned its Nome crew on Earth. When it asks its primary mission, Masklin tells it to keep the Nomes safe and get them home.

After the Thing picks up radio signals, indicating Arnold Bros is to be demolished, Masklin tries to persuade the 'Insiders' to evacuate. Only when the old Stationeri Abbot (who dies shortly afterwards) is convinced by the Thing, do they finally win the confidence of the Store Nomes. Taking command of the evacuation and guided by The Thing, Masklin, Grimma and a selected group of Nomes learn how to operate a truck using string and wood levers to operate the controls, then lead the Nomes to the loading bay and steal a truck filled with supplies. Arriving at an abandoned quarry, the Nomes begin a new life outside, while Masklin watches the planes at the local airport and plans the next step on their journey home.

=== Diggers (1990) ===
Things are going well for the Quarry Nomes since their escape from now-demolished Arnold Bros department store, with most of the former 'Inside' Nomes adapting to life outside. Torit dies from old age, while Masklin is struggling to deal with his feelings for Grimma. When he clumsily suggests that they should settle down together, Grimma instead tries to tell him that she does not want to be restricted by a conventional relationship, using the analogy of South American tree frogs that spend their whole lives in a plant called a bromeliad, not knowing anything of the outside world. Masklin does not understand, and the two fall out. When Masklin, Abbot Gurder and Angalo De Haberdasheri subsequently take The Thing with them to investigate the nearby airport but don't come back, it is left to Grimma to deal with a new threat, which is the reopening of an abandoned quarry.

Grimma, believing Masklin to be surely dead, finally admits her feelings for him but must put them aside to deal with an attempted revolt by Gurder's apprentice, Nisodemus, who proposes that they rebuild the store, but is challenged by Grimma. He stands in the road to prove to the Nomes that Arnold Bros chose him to be leader, but is run over by a car. After attempting to keep the returning humans out by locking the quarry gates, Dorcas and two other nomes try to remove a battery from a lorry, and it rolls down a hill into the path of an oncoming train. It is presumed that all three Nomes are killed. The Nomes in the quarry tie up a security guard and leave a message asking to be left alone. The quarry Nomes finally make an escape attempt using Jekub, an old JCB digger, which Dorcas discovered in an old shed and repaired. The digger allows the Nomes to escape en masse when the humans return. After being pursued across fields by police cars, they are rescued by Masklin aboard the recovered starship 'Swan'. Masklin presents Grimma with a bromeliad as a sign that he finally understands her, and they depart Earth for their home planet.

=== Wings (1990) ===
The story is not a sequel but happens simultaneously with the events of Diggers.

Masklin, Angalo and Gurder are searching for a plane. They have discovered from a newspaper article that Richard Arnold (or 'Grandson Richard, 39', as the paper refers to him), the grandson of the Arnold Brothers who originally built the store, is planning to fly to Florida for the launch of a new satellite. The Thing states that, if they can get it on board the space shuttle, it will be able to contact the spaceship 'Swan' which has been buried on the moon for thousands of years awaiting instructions.

The Thing connects to the airline computers and finds that 'Grandson Richard, 39' is due to board Concorde. They sneak on board, and Gurder is overwhelmed to find that the Concorde is just like the store inside, except that there are fewer places for the Nomes to hide. Masklin discovers where 'Grandson Richard, 39' is sitting, and he suggests hiding in his carry-on luggage.

Arriving in Florida, the Nomes help themselves to hotel food while Arnold is in the shower. Coming out unexpectedly, he sees Masklin, but they escape into the surrounding Everglades where they discover another group of Nomes led by Shrub and her son Pion. Initially they do not understand each other, but The Thing is able to translate; the new group of Nomes speak authentic Nomish, the original language of the Nomes.

The outside Nomes have learned how to ride wild geese and have established contact with thousands of other Nome tribes across the world. Travelling by goose, they reach the launch pad and place The Thing close enough to the shuttle to copy itself to the satellite on board. The Nomes escape moments before the rocket engine ignites.

Having used up its available power, The Thing shuts down. Masklin realises that without The Thing to guide the ship in, it could crash, so he is forced to reveal himself to the humans who take him to a building with a power source. The Thing recharges and informs Masklin that the ship will arrive shortly. While escaping, he encounters Richard Arnold, and Masklin uses The Thing to translate for him, asking Arnold for help. Arnold tells Masklin that his grandfather and great-uncle told stories about Nomes in the store because they heard noises at night, and helps him escape. Aboard the ship he meets up with Angalo, Gurder and Pion and they plan to return to the quarry to get the others, making a short detour to South America to pick up some frogs in a bromeliad.

The Nomes see Concorde flying over the sea to the east, and Masklin realises that it must be flying back to England. They arrive back at the quarry in time to see the Store Nomes careening around a nearby field on Jekub, pursued by a police car, and rescue them (as told in Diggers). Masklin presents Grimma with the bromeliad, and they reconcile. All the quarry Nomes climb onboard except for Gurder, who stays behind on Earth with The Thing to find and tell all other earthbound Nomes about the 'Swan'. They depart for home, promising to return one day and collect Gurder and all the other Nomes still left on Earth.

== Main characters ==
- Masklin is a brave and adventurous member of the Outside Nomes.
- The Thing is a small, sentient computer, and is part of 'The Ship'.
- Torrit, also called "Old Torrit", is the elderly leader of the Outside Nomes, who was tasked to keep The Thing safe. His recent death is mentioned early on in Diggers.
- Grimma is a female counterpart to Masklin and something of a feminist.
- Gurder is a religious store Nome who later becomes the abbot.
- Angalo De Haberdasheri is a store Nome obsessed with the 'Outside', who welcomes the Outsiders on their arrival in the store.
- Dorcas del Icatessen is the most scientific of the Nomes and is interested in electricity.
- Granny Morkie is a fearsome, elderly outside Nome. She is a healer, of sorts, and never happier than when predicting disaster.
- Arnold Bros (est. 1905) is the 'founder' of the Store and godlike figure to the Nomes.
- Shrub is the leader of the Floridian Nomes who knows how to control geese.

=== Appearing only in Truckers ===
- The Abbot is the leader of the Stationeri. He dies of old age in Truckers and is succeeded by his assistant, Gurder.
- Duke Cido de Haberdasheri is Angalo's father and the leader of the Haberdasheri.
- Bargains Galore is a benevolent spirit that the Nomes believed in and sometimes prayed to. In one scene, a cleaner was thought to be her.
- Prices Slashed is the Nomes' name for a bogeyman type figure, in fact the store's caretaker who is also the store's boilerman.

=== Appearing only in Diggers ===
- Sacco and Nooty
- Nisodemus

=== Appearing only in Wings ===
- The Floridian Nomes
- Topknot
- Pion
- Richard Arnold, also called "Grandson Richard, 39" by Gurder, appears briefly in Diggers. He is loosely based on Richard Branson.
- The bromeliad frogs
- Shrub

== Adaptations ==
=== TV series ===
A stop motion animated series of Truckers was produced in the United Kingdom by Cosgrove Hall Films.

=== Film ===
In 2001, DreamWorks (now DreamWorks Animation) acquired the film rights to the trilogy, and planned to combine all three books into a single film, to be directed by Andrew Adamson. In late 2008, Danny Boyle was attached to direct Truckers, but the project fell apart due to financial problems. The following year, screenwriter Simon Beaufoy was hired to work on the project. Plans to move forward with DreamWorks' adaptation resurfaced in 2010 when screenwriter John Orloff was hired to pen the script for director Anand Tucker, who was later attached to direct another DWA film Trolls, which was planned to be partially based on a Pratchett novel, before he was replaced by Mike Mitchell.
