= The Dark Side of the Sun =

1976 novel by Terry Pratchett

- First edition
- Author: Terry Pratchett
- Cover artist: Terry Pratchett
- Language: English
- Genre: Science fiction
- Publisher: Colin Smythe
- Publication date: 26 Jan 1976
- Publication place: United Kingdom
- Media type: Print (Hardcover)
- Pages: 158
- ISBN: 0-901072-20-6
- OCLC: 2993255

The Dark Side of the Sun is a science fiction novel by Terry Pratchett, first published in 1976.

It is similar to the work of Isaac Asimov. According to Don D'Ammassa, both this and Pratchett's 1981 sci-fi novel Strata spoof parts of Larry Niven's Ringworld. The holiday of Hogswatch, which appears in the Discworld books, is celebrated by the characters in The Dark Side of the Sun.

== Overview ==
The story is set in a portion of the galaxy populated by fifty-two different sentient species. All of these species, humanity among them, have evolved in the last five million years, and all of them have evolved in a spherical volume of space less than two hundred light-years across centred on Wolf 429. The rest of the galaxy is sterile as far as anybody can tell.

Scattered irregularly across this "life-bubble" are ancient artefacts of a mysterious race called the Jokers, who apparently became extinct long before any of the current races arose. These artefacts are usually astounding feats of engineering (such as a pair of stars shaped into rings and joined like links in a chain), but leave no hints about the Jokers' physical form or day-to-day life. The only piece of translatable Joker text is a poem, which cryptically states that they have gone to their new home, which "lies at the dark side of the sun".

== Plot ==
Dominickdaniel "Dom" Sabalos IV is the son of a prodigy of probability math, a science able to predict anything apart from anything to do with the Jokers, and the first person to have had his life fully quantified using p-math. His father, before being mysteriously assassinated, predicted that Dom too would be killed, on the day of his investiture as chairman of his home planet of Widdershins.

However, not having been told of his father's prediction, and against incalculably distant odds, Dom survives the assassination attempt. When the recording of his father's prediction is played back, a time delay added specifically for this unlikely eventuality plays a little more of the recording, in which his father makes a further prediction: that Dom will discover the Jokers' homeworld.

Dom sets out, with Hrsh-Hgn (his tutor, a swamp-dwelling phnobe), Isaac (his robot, equipped with Man-Friday subcircuitry) and Ig (his pet swamp ig) in tow, on a picaresque adventure to find the Jokers' world. He visits many corners of the "life-bubble", encountering Joker artifacts, his god-father, who is a sentient planet, and the sexless, octopoid Creapii, among many other weird and diverse aliens and planets. At the same time he finds himself surviving – at increasingly improbable odds – numerous assassination attempts by a mysterious conspiracy which has long worked to prevent anybody from locating the Jokers, assassinating anybody deemed by p-math having a chance of doing so.

== Characters ==
- Dom Sabalos - chairman of the Board of Directors of Widdershins.
- Joan Sabalos - Dom's grandmother.
- Vian Sabalos - Dom's mother, widow of
- John Sabalos, Dom's father.
- Hrsh-Hgn - Dom's tutor; a Phnobe.
- Isaac - robot with a Class 5 brain.
- Ways - the lucky assassin robot.
- Ig - Dom's "pet" ig.

== Setting ==
The book is set in the far future. No current date is given, although the dating system is "A.S." (After Sadhim).

Widdershins is a planet orbiting the star CY Acquirii (a parody of CY Aquarii) settled by a joint party of phnobes and earth-humans. The planet is mostly water and marsh. Their wealth derives from both the chance discovery of pilac, a safe death-immunity drug and googoo, a fungal copier and regenerator of human tissue. The vegetation is blue.

=== Races ===
52 different sentient species (including earth-humanity) exist in the novel.

Chief among them are:

- Earth-humans – Natives of Old Earth who have settled such diverse worlds as Third Eye and Eggplant.
  - Subraces:
    - Widdershine – left-handed, night-black skin, hairless, UV-tolerant eyes, skin-cancer resistant
    - Terra Novae – stocky, two hearts
    - Pineals – Phobish
    - Whole Erse – warriors
    - Eggplant – vegetarian carnivores
    - Third Eye – telepathic
    - Class Five Robots – the most sentient and intelligent kind
- Phnobes – Natives of Phnobis. Three sexes.
- Creapii – Natives from Creap, first planet of 70 Ophiuchis A. Oldest race (after Jokers). Octopodial. Non-gendered. Extremophiles. Names are chemical and degrees (e.g. CReegE + 698°).
  - Sub-species:
    - Low-degree (silicon-oxygen)
    - Middle-degree (silicon-carbon, 500 °C)
    - High-degree (aluminum-silicon polymer)
    - Others (silicon-boron, etc.)
- Drosks – Natives of Quaducquakucckuaquekekecqac. Cuboid, omni-carnivores.
- Sundogs – Natives from Eggplant, since relocated to Band. Space dwellers, lay eggs (in orbit of Band) every ten years.

The rest:

- Spooners – small, icy worlds
- Tarquins – protostar dwellers
- The Pod – Space roaming hydrogen eaters
- Sidewinders
- The Two Evolutions of Seard
- Jokers – Natives of Jokers World. Elder race.
- The First Sirian Bank – intelligent world, legally Human
- Chatogaster – living water
