= The Leaky Establishment =

1984 novel by David Langford

- First edition
- Author: David Langford
- Language: English
- Publisher: Frederick Muller Ltd
- Publication date: 1984

The Leaky Establishment is a novel by David Langford, first published in June 1984 by Frederick Muller Ltd. It was re-issued, with an introduction by Terry Pratchett, in 2001 by Big Engine, and then in July 2003 by Cosmos Books. The book draws on some of Langford's own experiences working at the United Kingdom government's Atomic Weapons Research Establishment at Aldermaston, Berkshire.

== Plot introduction ==
Roy Tappen works for the Robinson Heath Nuclear Utilisation Technology Centre, a nuclear weapons facility in Britain. He fights bureaucracy while trying to use it for his purpose, which is to undo the potentially disastrous results of a practical joke gone wrong.

Smuggling plutonium out of a nuclear research centre turns out to be surprisingly easy. The difficult part is smuggling it back in again without getting caught.
