= A Slip of the Keyboard =

Non-fiction anthology by Terry Pratchett

- Author: Terry Pratchett
- Language: English
- Publisher: Doubleday
- Publication date: September 14, 2014
- Pages: 315
- ISBN: 978-0-857-52122-4

A Slip of the Keyboard is the first non fiction anthology by Terry Pratchett. It was first published in 2014, with a foreword by Neil Gaiman.

== Contents ==
The anthology is divided into the main sections with contents as follows:

- A Scribbling Intruder
  - Thought Progress (1989)
  - Palmtop (1993)
  - The Choice Word (2000)
  - How to Be a Professional Boxer (2005)
  - Brewer's Boy (1999)
  - Paperback Writer (2003)
  - Advice to Booksellers (1999)
  - No Worries (1998)
  - Conventional Wisdom (2011)
  - Straight from the Heart, via the Groin (2004)
  - Discworld Turns 21 (2004)
  - Kevins (1993)
  - Wyrd Ideas (1999)
  - Notes from a Successful Fantasy Author: Keep It Real (2007)
  - Whose Fantasy Are You? (1991)
  - Why Gandalf Never Married (1985)
  - Roots of Fantasy (1989)
  - Elves Were Bastards (1992)
  - Let There Be Dragons (1993)
  - Magic Kingdoms (1999)
  - Cult Classic (2001)
  - Neil Gaiman: Amazing Master Conjuror (2002)
  - 2001 Carnegie Medal Award Speech (2002)
  - Boston Globe–Horn Book Award Speech for Nation (2009)
  - Watching Nation (2009)
  - Doctor Who? (2001)
  - A Word About Hats (2001)
- A Twit and a Dreamer
  - The Big Store (2002)
  - Roundhead Wood, Forty Green (1996)
  - A Star Pupil (2011)
  - On Granny Pratchett (2004)
  - Tales of Wonder and of Porn (2004)
  - Letter to Vector (1963)
  - Writer's Choice (2004)
  - Introduction to Roy Lewis's The Evolution Man (1989)
  - The King and I, or How the Bottom Has Dropped Out of the Wise Man Business (1970)
  - Honey, These Bees Had a Heart of Gold (1976)
  - That Sounds Fungi, It Must Be the Dawn Chorus (1976)
  - Introduction to The Leaky Establishment by David Langford (2001)
  - The Meaning of My Christmas (1997)
  - Alien Christmas (1987)
  - 2001: The Vision and the Reality (2000)
  - The God Moment (2008)
  - A Genuine Absent-minded Professor (2010)
  - Saturdays (2011)
- Days of Rage
  - On Excellence in Schools. Education: What It Means to You (1997)
  - The Orangutans Are Dying (2000)
  - The NHS Is Seriously Injured (2008)
  - I'm Slipping Away a Bit at a Time ... and All I Can Do Is Watch It Happen (2008)
  - Taxworld (2009)
  - Point Me to Heaven When the Final Chapter Comes (2009)
  - The Richard Dimbleby Lecture: Shaking Hands with Death (2010)
  - At Last We Have Real Compassion in Assisted-Dying Guidelines (2010)
  - Assisted Dying: It's Time the Government Gave Us the Right to End Our Lives (2011)
  - Death Knocked and We Let Him In (2011)
  - A Week in the Death of Terry Pratchett (2011)
- And Finally...
  - Terry Pratchett's Wild Unattached Footnotes to Life (1990)
