= Living Space =

- Short story by Isaac Asimov
- Country: United States
- Language: English
- Genre: Science fiction

Publication
- Published in: Science Fiction
- Publication type: Periodical
- Publisher: Columbia Publications
- Media type: Print (Magazine, Hardback & Paperback)
- Publication date: May 1956

"Living Space" is a science fiction short story by American writer Isaac Asimov. It was first published in the May 1956 issue of Science Fiction and reprinted in the 1957 collection Earth Is Room Enough. It concerns itself with a possible consequence of the existence of parallel universes, specifically the ones where life on Earth never developed.

== Plot summary ==
Clarence Rimbro owns the entire planet Earth. This is no great accomplishment as, thousands of years in our future, anyone can do it. There are an infinite number of possible Earths, each existing in its own parallel universe. If the chance of life arising on any one of them is about 50%, then half the time a random choice of a parallel universe will lead to a dead Earth. Since there are a trillion people living in this time, it would be almost impossible for them to live on one Earth, so each family sets up its house and garden, protected by a force field and running on solar power, on a dead Earth. Clarence enjoys total independence for his family, and an entire planet's worth of living space. As there are still an infinite number of dead Earths, they can never be filled up, and nobody is worried about the population becoming two trillion in fifty years or so.

Clarence finds he has a problem. There are noises and rumbling disturbing the silence of his domain. Naturally, he does what people usually do, and complains to the authorities. At the Housing Bureau are two co-workers; Bill Ching, who believes fervently in the parallel Earths as the solution, and Alec Mishnoff, who worries about something he only hints at to others. Both agree to visit Clarence's Earth to check out the mysterious sounds. With a seismograph they determine that the rumbles are due to some kind of surface activity, not deep earthquakes. To get a location, someone will have to leave the force field and set up a second seismograph.

Mishnoff, with his own agenda, sets out in a protective suit into the carbon dioxide atmosphere. It does not take him long to find the source of the sounds. When he does, he is accosted by a stranger who talks to him in a dead language—German.

After a confusing conversation, Mishnoff realizes that the man is from a parallel Earth where Nazi Germany conquered the entire planet. They are blasting and digging for a new settlement on the Rimbro's Earth. Back on his own Earth, Mishnoff explains to Ching and his boss, Berg, that there must be an infinite number of societies who are also using dead Earths for living space. By sheer chance, some will occupy Earths that Mishnoff's society are using. There are probably many Earths with multiple occupants, but in most cases the settlements were too far apart to affect one another—until now.

After Ching leaves, Berg asks Mishnoff about his own theory, the one he refuses to share. Mishnoff, it turns out, is concerned about the probability that life in some universe will arise somewhere other than Earth, and will find its way to his Earth through the portal on one of the dead Earths. The odds are low, of course, but there are now hundreds of billions of dead Earths occupied by a single house. Just then Ching rushes in with another customer complaint - someone is worried about the red creatures with tentacles who are peering into his glass house.

== Themes ==
The story's name, "Living Space" is a direct translation of the German "Lebensraum", a key concept of Nazi ideology used to justify conquest and expansion of the "Aryan Race" at the expense of "Inferior Races". In the context of the story, there is a far more innocuous way, unlimited "Living Space" available with no need to fight or conquer anybody, and is utilized not only by the people of Rimbro's timeline, but also by those of the Nazi-victorious timeline. And though mass horrors must have been perpetrated in the aftermath of the Nazi victory, for the people of that timeline - in whose calendar this year is thousands of years "After Hitler" - these are events of the distant past and the ones encountered in the story seem quite civilized. Once finding that the Earth on which Rimbro lives is already claimed, they accept this prior claim and go away (why fight when there is a literally infinite number of other worlds just as good?).

Also for Rimbro's people, Hitler and Nazism are a piece of quite ancient history. ("Hitler was a sort of tribal chief in ancient times. He led the German tribe in one of the wars of the twentieth century, just about the time the Atomic Age started and true history began.") The horrors of Nazi Germany seem to be forgotten - except, perhaps, by professional historians (which none of the characters are).

== See also ==
- Axis victory in World War II
- The Long Earth (series)
