= The Long Utopia =

2015 science fiction novel by Terry Pratchett and Stephen Baxter

- First edition
- Author: Terry Pratchett & Stephen Baxter
- Cover artist: Richard Shailer
- Language: English
- Series: The Long Earth
- Genre: Science fiction novel
- Publisher: Doubleday
- Publication date: 23 June 2015
- Publication place: United Kingdom
- Media type: Print (hardcover)
- ISBN: 978-0-85752-176-7
- Preceded by: The Long Mars
- Followed by: The Long Cosmos

The Long Utopia is a science fiction novel by Terry Pratchett and Stephen Baxter published on 23 June 2015.

It is the fourth in the five-book series of the sequence The Long Earth.

== Plot ==
The Long Utopia further follows the adventures of Joshua Valienté and Lobsang, as well as delving into Joshua's ancestry. After faking his death, Lobsang and his wife settle on an unexplored Earth, the rotation of which is being artificially accelerated without their knowledge.
