= The Long Mars =

2014 science fiction novel by Terry Pratchett and Stephen Baxter

- Author: Terry Pratchett & Stephen Baxter
- Cover artist: Richard Shailer
- Language: English
- Series: The Long Earth
- Genre: Science fiction
- Publisher: Doubleday
- Publication date: 19 June 2014
- Publication place: United Kingdom
- Media type: Print (hardcover)
- Pages: 357 pp (hardcover)
- ISBN: 978-0-85752-174-3
- Preceded by: The Long War
- Followed by: The Long Utopia

The Long Mars is a science fiction novel by English writers Terry Pratchett and Stephen Baxter.

It is the third in a five-book series of the parallel-Earth sequence The Long Earth. Originally entitled The Long Childhood, it was changed to The Long Mars, and published on 19 June 2014. The paperback edition was published by Harper on 7 August 2014.

In the novel, Sally Linsay, her father, and a burned-out astronaut friend travel to Mars and find that it too has co-existing alternate worlds accessible to their technology. While many are lifeless and possess atmospheres as thin as those of Mars within our universe, others possess oceans, life forms and intelligent life.

== See also ==
- Rainbow Mars, collection including another short story with alternate versions of Mars, which began as a proposed collaboration between Larry Niven and Terry Pratchett.
- Manifold: Origin, a novel by Stephen Baxter centered on alternate versions of the Moon
