= Bucks Free Press =

Weekly newspaper covering High Wycombe

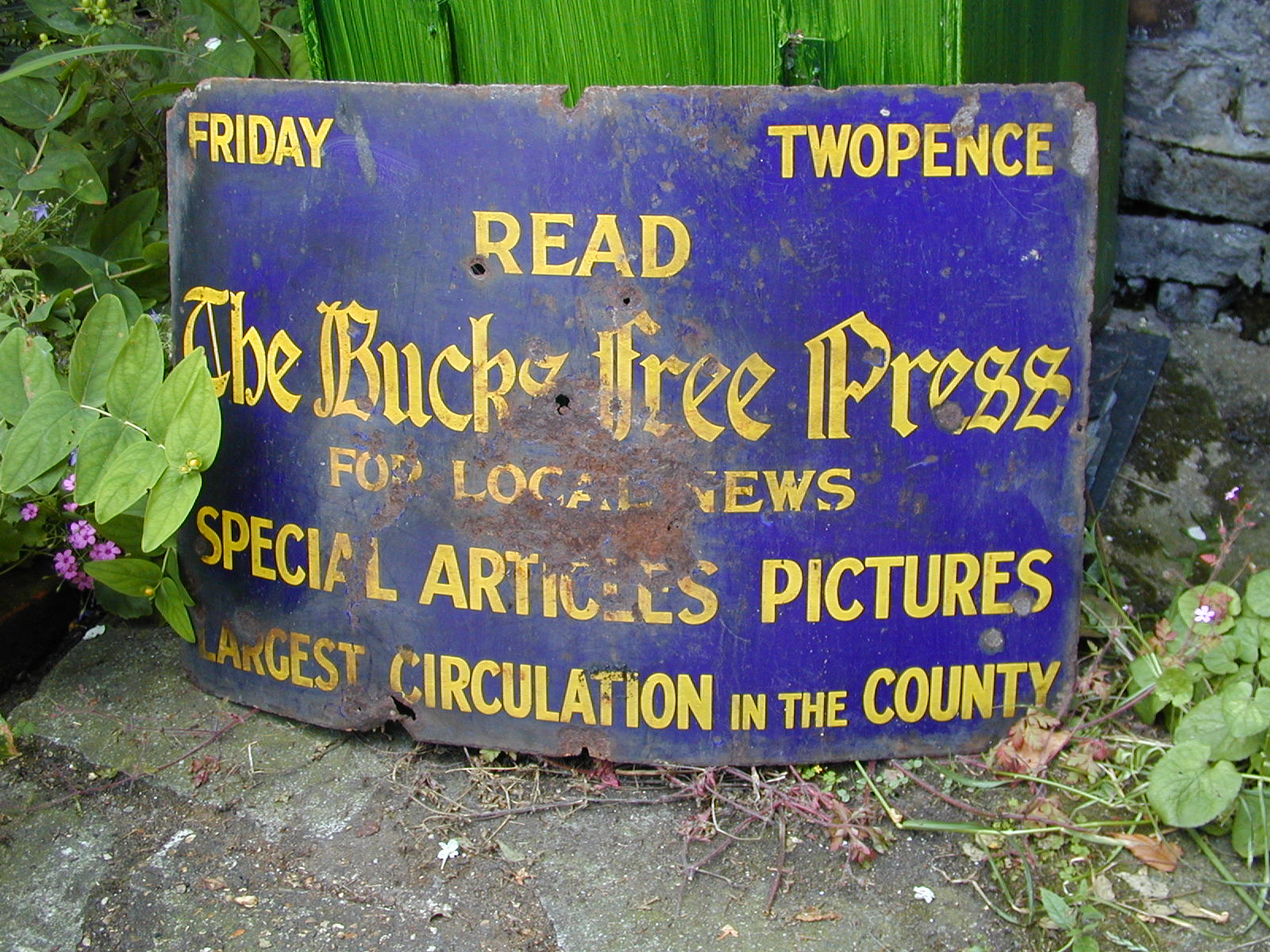
- Read The Bucks Free Press
- Type: Weekly newspaper
- Format: Tabloid
- Publisher: Newsquest
- Founded: 1856
- Language: English
- Headquarters: Loudwater, Buckinghamshire
- Circulation: 8,000 (as of 2025)
- Website: bucksfreepress.co.uk

The Bucks Free Press is a weekly local newspaper, published every Friday and covering the area surrounding High Wycombe, Buckinghamshire, England. It was first published on 19 December 1856.

It covers news for south Buckinghamshire—focusing primarily on High Wycombe, Amersham, Princes Risborough and Beaconsfield—as opposed to the entire county.

Marlow has its own edition called the Marlow Free Press which has a number of changed pages.

The paper covers local news, features, leisure and sport. The sport section features extensive coverage of Wycombe Wanderers football club who play at Adams Park, High Wycombe.

Alongside the main Bucks Free Press paper, it also publishes an Aylesbury edition and a Chesham and Amersham edition each week.

Between 1956 and 1976 the editor was Arthur Church.

The fantasy novelist Terry Pratchett started his career as an apprentice journalist with the Bucks Free Press in September 1965.

In 1968 a sister paper was set up in the form of the Midweek Free Press.

In March 2017, the paper appointed the first female editor in its history, Samantha Harman. The current editor is Katie French who oversees Newsquest's Buckinghamshire and Berkshire region as regional editor.

== Notable journalists ==
- Terry Pratchett (1948–2015), comic fantasy writer, started as a trainee in 1965. In 2010 Bucks Free Press released an online anthology of 250 short stories by Pratchett originally published between 1965 and 1970. Additional short stories, written under the previously unknown pseudonym Uncle Jim were discovered in the 2020s, and included in the 2023 posthumous book A Stroke of the Pen: The Lost Stories.
