= The Long Earth (series) =

Science fiction novel series by Terry Pratchett and Stephen Baxter

- 1. The Long Earth; 2. The Long War; 3. The Long Mars; 4. The Long Utopia; 5. The Long Cosmos
- Author: Terry Pratchett & Stephen Baxter
- Country: United Kingdom
- Language: English
- Genre: Science fiction novel
- Publisher: Doubleday and Harper
- Published: 19 June 2012
- Media type: Print (hardcover & paperback), eBook, and audio Book

The Long Earth is a parallel-universe-themed collaborative science fiction novel series by British authors Terry Pratchett and Stephen Baxter.

At the time of Pratchett's death (12 March 2015), three novels had been released, with a fourth published on 23 June 2015 and the fifth published on 30 June 2016.

== Development ==
The original basis for the series was Pratchett's then-unpublished short story "The High Meggas", which he wrote as a starting point for a potential series while his first Discworld novel, The Colour of Magic, was undergoing publication. The success of The Colour of Magic prompted Pratchett to put the story aside in favour of working on The Light Fantastic. The idea resurfaced in late 2010 following a dinner conversation with his assistant and American agent, and discussion with Stephen Baxter prompted the development of the first book in the series, The Long Earth, and the collaboration between the two authors. Both authors signed contracts for a total of five books in the series.

Pratchett and Baxter primarily write in different fields of literature. Baxter has written in fields of 'hard science', evolutionary speculation and alternative history. Although Pratchett has written some science fiction, he is primarily known for his fantasy series of Discworld novels. Although both authors spoke publicly about the outline for the novel, no public readings of any material were given (something which Pratchett frequently did at Discworld conventions).

In 2010, they planned only two books but following the completion of the first draft of the first volume in December 2011, they split it in two, and presented their publishers with a plan for a pentalogy. Pratchett announced on Twitter the completion of the first draft of The Long Earth in December 2011. The book was released in the United States on 19 June 2012. A sequel titled The Long War was released on 20 June 2013, and The Long Mars was published on 17 June 2014. The third sequel The Long Utopia was released on 18 June 2015, and the final book in the pentalogy, The Long Cosmos, was published on 30 June 2016.

== Series summary ==
The Long Earth is a name given to a possibly infinite series of parallel worlds that are similar to Earth, which can be reached using an inexpensive device called a Stepper. The "close" worlds are almost identical to Earth (referred to as Datum Earth), while others differ radically. Despite this they all share one similarity: on none are there or have there ever been humans — although some are inhabited by earlier hominid species such as Homo habilis.

The books explore the theme of how humanity might develop when freed from resource constraints: one example Pratchett has cited is that wars result from lack of land, and he was curious as to what would happen if there was no shortage of land or other resources.

== Reception ==
The series has been discussed by Lauren J. Lacey as an example of a work dealing with the concept of heterotopia.

== Books ==
1. The Long Earth (June 2012)
2. The Long War (June 2013)
3. The Long Mars (June 2014)
4. The Long Utopia (June 2015)
5. The Long Cosmos (June 2016)

== See also ==
- Sliders (TV series)
- Living Space by Isaac Asimov
