= The Long War (novel) =

2013 science fiction novel by Terry Pratchett and Stephen Baxter

- Author: Terry Pratchett & Stephen Baxter
- Cover artist: Richard Shailer
- Language: English
- Series: The Long Earth
- Genre: Science fiction
- Publisher: Doubleday
- Publication date: 18 June 2013
- Publication place: United Kingdom
- Media type: Print (hardcover)
- Pages: 432
- ISBN: 978-0062067777
- Preceded by: The Long Earth
- Followed by: The Long Mars

The Long War is a science fiction novel by British writers Terry Pratchett and Stephen Baxter. It is a sequel to their parallel-Earth novel The Long Earth. This book is the second in a five-book series.

== Plot summary ==
A generation after the events of The Long Earth, mankind has spread across the new worlds opened up by Stepping. Where Joshua and Lobsang once pioneered, fleets of airships (known as "Twains") now link the stepwise Americas with trade and culture. Mankind is shaping the Long Earth, but in turn, the Long Earth is shaping mankind. A new "America," called Valhalla, is emerging more than a million steps from Datum Earth, with core American values restated in the plentiful environment of the Long Earth, using "combing," slang for hunting-gathering to support their economy. Valhalla is growing restless under the control of the Datum government.

Meanwhile, the Long Earth is suffused by the song of the trolls, graceful hive-mind humanoids. However, the trolls are beginning to react to humanity's thoughtless exploitation. Joshua, now married to Helen, is summoned by Lobsang to deal with multiple gathering crises that threaten to plunge the Long Earth into a war unlike any humankind has waged before.

When Sally turns up unexpectedly at Joshua's home—now in Hell-Knows-Where, a small town on Earth West 1,397,426, where he has been elected Mayor—Joshua is forced to return with his family, wife Helen, and son Dan, to Datum Earth to investigate and defuse the growing tensions between humans and trolls. Soon after their arrival, Sally dashes off to Earth West two million, the enigmatic "Gap" world existing without an Earth, with Ex-Lieutenant Jansson (now stricken with leukemia from her efforts with the Madison bombing and nuclear fallout) to aid Mary the troll and her son from possible execution.

Joshua eventually follows with the help of Bill and another Lobsang, skipping across Earths in a new Twain to find Sally, Jansson, and the lost trolls. Upon arriving, Joshua is detained using a device to stop a stepper from stepping (a contraption that would trigger if he stepped) by a race of highly evolved dogs called "Beagles" who force Sally and Jansson, with the help of a kobold, to retrieve weapons from a cache on another world left by a long-dead race.

Nelson, a new character to the series groomed by the Black Corporation and Lobsang, seeks out Lobsang and embarks on a mission West. Upon finding Joshua (still imprisoned on the Beagle world), Lobsang makes a speech and successfully implores the trolls to return to their natural place throughout the Long Earth, now cohabitating with humans.

When Sally and Jansson return with the weapons, the Beagles "honour" Joshua by hunting him—with the intent of providing him with a glorious death. Two of the Beagles come to the understanding that humans and human wishes are different, bite off Joshua's hand, and return it to the GrandDaughter (the Beagle Princess) as proof of his "death."

US Navy Twain Captain Maggie Kauffman is sent in the ship Benjamin Franklin by the US President Cowley (a former leader of the same organization that arranged the Madison bombings) to reinforce the need to have an overarching government presiding over the US continents throughout the Long Earth. Upon reaching the destination of their mission, Valhalla, they find a peaceful settlement with "rebel" leader Jack Green (father of Helen as well as Rod, the Madison bomber).

Joshua, now safely home, refuses a Black Corporation prosthetic hand in favour of a clunky mechanical one—keeping once more from Lobsang's reach.

Once everyone has returned to the Datum (or close by), Yellowstone erupts on Datum, causing most of America to flee stepwise.

== Characters ==
- Joshua Valienté: Now long married to Helen and residing in Hell-Knows-Where, acting as Mayor.
- Lobsang: An artificial intelligence acting as a reluctant demigod to the Long Earth.
- Monica Jansson: Ex-Madison police officer with late-stage leukaemia.
- Sally Linsay: Natural stepper, former romantic interest of Joshua, and self-appointed representative and saviour of the troll migration.
- Maggie Kauffman: A US Navy Twain Captain delegated a mission to cross the Long Earth and remind residents of the US continents (whichever stepwise Earth they reside on) that the US government is still in force.
- Sister Agnes: A nun and Joshua's former carer at the orphanage; she is brought back to life as an artificial intelligence by Lobsang to act as his conscience.
- Nelson Azikiwe: A priest who leaves to travel the Long Earth with Lobsang.
- Daniel Valienté: Joshua's young son.
- Helen Valienté: Joshua's wife.
- Mary: A troll kept captive next to "The Gap" who injures a resident human.
- Ham: A mistreated troll, son of Mary, who was to be experimented on by being taken into The Gap.
- Carl: A troll who joins Maggie Kauffman's cause.
- Finn McCool: A kobold who exchanges information with humans for a price.
- Petra: A Beagle and the GrandDaughter of the Mother (a title similar to Prince or Lord) of the Beagle Empire.

== Sequel ==
A third Long Earth book, originally entitled The Long Childhood but later changed to The Long Mars, was published on 19 June 2014.
