= The Long Cosmos =

2016 science fiction book by Terry Pratchett and Stephen Baxter

- Author: Terry Pratchett & Stephen Baxter
- Cover artist: First US edition
- Language: English
- Series: The Long Earth
- Genre: Science fiction novel
- Publisher: Penguin Random House
- Publication date: 30 June 2016
- Publication place: United Kingdom
- Media type: Print (hardcover)
- Preceded by: The Long Utopia

The Long Cosmos is a science fiction novel by Terry Pratchett and Stephen Baxter published on 30 June 2016. It is the final installment in the award-winning five-book parallel-Earth series The Long Earth.

It is the fifth book in the series published posthumously from Terry Pratchett.

== Plot ==
The Long Cosmos further follows the adventures of Joshua Valienté and Lobsang.
