= Colin Smythe =

Irish writer (born 1942)

- Founder: Colin Smythe
- Country of origin: United Kingdom
- Headquarters location: Gerrards Cross
- Distribution: Self-distribution (UK); Casemate Group (US)
- Publication types: Books
- Fiction genres: Science fiction, fantasy, Irish literature
- Official website: colinsmythe.co.uk

Colin Smythe (born 1942) is a bibliographer of W.B. Yeats and other Irish authors and is a literary agent. He is also a publisher, having founded his publishing house in 1966 with Peter Bander van Duren. He is based in Buckinghamshire, England.

Smythe published the first five Terry Pratchett novels and later acted as Pratchett's agent. In 1971, Smythe published Konstantin Raudive's Breakthrough, the first book in the English language on the Electronic Voice Phenomenon (EVP) and the inspiration for the film White Noise. Other authors published include George Moore, Lady Gregory and Oliver St John Gogarty.

In 1973 he would help launch The Psychic Researcher & Spiritualist Gazette where he acted as features and review editor.
