= Terry Pratchett =

English fantasy author (1948–2015)

Sir Terry Pratchett OBE
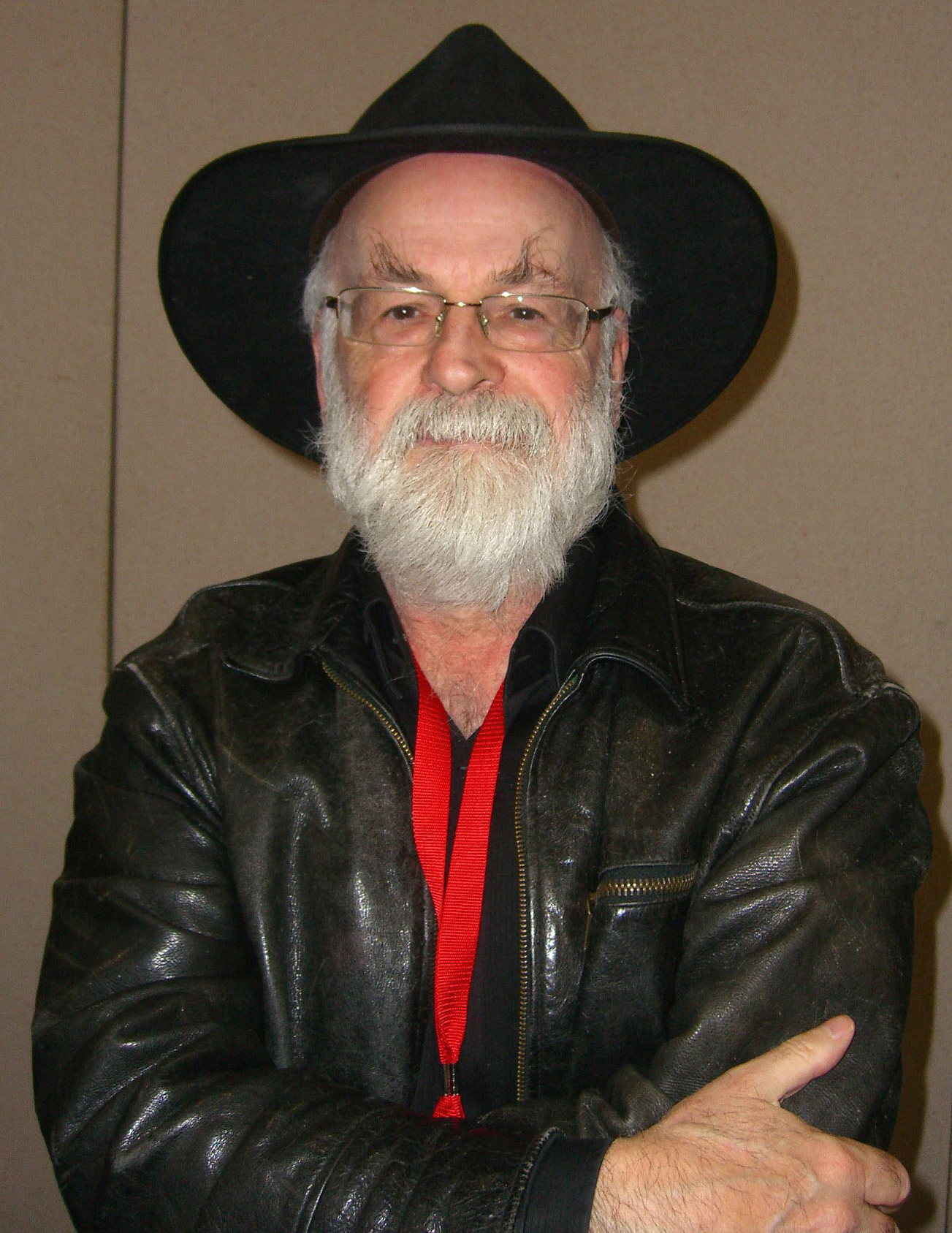
- Pratchett at the 2012 New York Comic Con
- Born: Terence David John Pratchett; 28 April 1948; Beaconsfield, Buckinghamshire, England
- Died: 12 March 2015 (aged 66); Broad Chalke, Wiltshire, England
- Occupation: Novelist
- Spouse: Lyn Purves (m. 1968)
- Children: Rhianna Pratchett
- Writing career
- Pen name: Patrick Kearns; Uncle Jim
- Language: English
- Period: 1965-2015
- Genres: Comic fantasy; satire; science fiction
- Notable works: Discworld; Good Omens
- Notable awards: Knight Bachelor 2009; Order of the British Empire – Officer 1998
- Terry Pratchett's voice Recorded May 2008 from the BBC Radio 4 programme Bookclub
- Website: terrypratchettbooks.com

Sir Terence David John Pratchett (28 April 1948 – 12 March 2015) was an English author, humorist, and satirist, best known for the Discworld series of 41 comic fantasy novels published between 1983 and 2015, and for the apocalyptic comedy novel Good Omens (1990), which he co-wrote with Neil Gaiman.

Pratchett's first novel, The Carpet People, was published in 1971. The first Discworld novel, The Colour of Magic, was published in 1983, after which Pratchett wrote an average of two books a year. The final Discworld novel, The Shepherd's Crown, was published in August 2015, five months after his death.

With more than 100 million books sold worldwide in 43 languages, Pratchett was the UK's best-selling author of the 1990s. He was appointed an Officer of the Order of the British Empire (OBE) in 1998 and was knighted for services to literature in the 2009 New Year Honours. In 2001, he won the annual Carnegie Medal for The Amazing Maurice and His Educated Rodents, the first Discworld book marketed for children. He received the World Fantasy Award for Life Achievement in 2010.

In December 2007 Pratchett announced that he had been diagnosed with early-onset Alzheimer's disease. He later made a substantial public donation to the Alzheimer's Research Trust (now Alzheimer's Research UK, ARUK), filmed three television programmes chronicling his experiences with the condition for the BBC, and became a patron of ARUK. Pratchett died on 12 March 2015, at the age of 66.

== Early life and education ==
Pratchett was born on 28 April 1948 in Beaconsfield in Buckinghamshire, England, the only child of David (1921–2006), a mechanic, and Eileen Pratchett (née Kearns) (1922–2010), a secretary, of Hay-on-Wye. His maternal grandparents came from Ireland. Pratchett attended Holtspur School, where he was bullied for his speech impediments. He was disliked by the head teacher, who, Pratchett said, thought "he could tell how successful you were going to be in later life by how well you could read or write at the age of six".

Pratchett's family moved to Bridgwater, Somerset, briefly in 1957. He passed his eleven plus exam in 1958, earning a place at High Wycombe Technical High School, (Note: Pratchett gave his eleven plus exam in 1958 according to biographer Marc Burrows, and in 1959 according to Craig Cabell.) where he was a key member of the debating society and wrote stories for the school magazine. Pratchett described himself as a "non-descript" student and, in his Who's Who entry, credited his education to the Beaconsfield Public Library.

Pratchett's early interests included astronomy. He collected Brooke Bond tea cards about space, owned a telescope and wanted to be an astronomer, but lacked the necessary mathematical skills. He developed an interest in science fiction and attended science fiction conventions from about 1963–1964, but stopped a few years later when he got his first job as a trainee journalist at the local paper. His early reading included the works of H. G. Wells, Arthur Conan Doyle, and "every book you really ought to read", which he later regarded as "getting an education".

Pratchett published his first short story, "Business Rivals", in the High Wycombe Technical School's magazine in 1962. It is the tale of a man named Crucible who finds the Devil in his flat in a cloud of sulphurous smoke. "The Hades Business" was published in the school magazine when he was 13, and published commercially in Science Fantasy magazine when he was 15.

Pratchett earned five O-levels and started A-level courses in Art, English and History. He completed his English A-level while on day release from his apprenticeship, and took the National Council for the Training of Journalists proficiency course.

== Career ==
=== Shorts and early novels (1965–1982) ===
Pratchett left school at aged 17, in 1965, to start a career in journalism. He began this with an apprenticeship with Arthur Church, the editor of the Bucks Free Press. In this position he wrote, among other things, more than 80 stories for the Children's Circle section under the name Uncle Jim. These were published regularly by the outlet, with the first on 8 October 1965. Pratchett said in later interviews that he struggled with other aspects of journalism, such as door-step interviews. In November 1965 he had a short story called Night Dweller published in New Worlds magazine. In 1968 Pratchett interviewed Peter Bander van Duren, co-director of a small publishing company, Colin Smythe Ltd. Pratchett mentioned that he had written a manuscript, The Carpet People. Colin Smythe Ltd published the book in 1971, with illustrations by Pratchett. It received strong, although few, reviews. Between September 1970 and April 1971 he worked for the Western Daily Press before being fired by the then editor Eric Price and going back to work at the Bucks Free Press where he worked as a sub editor.

Beginning in 1972 he also wrote short fiction under the pen name "Patrick Kearns" which was serialized in the Western Daily Press. The use of a different pen name was likely because he was officially working for other papers at the time. The "Kearns" title was his mother's maiden name. He wrote 20 stories for the paper between then and 1984, shortly after publishing the first Discworld book. As a consequence of the pen name, the stories remained essentially unknown until a 2023 investigation. It had previously been thought that he became inactive as a writer at times but this was not the case. The works are known as the "Lost Stories" and are collected in A Stroke of the Pen. He started working for the Bath Chronicle in 1973, and published one further novel while working there, the science fiction novel The Dark Side of the Sun (1976).

In 1979 he took a job as press officer for the South West Region of the Central Electricity Generating Board (CEGB) in an area that contained three nuclear power stations. (Note: Burrows states that Pratchett joined the CEGB in 1979 and oversaw three nuclear stations, but according to Cabell, he started work in 1980 and the number of stations may have been either three or four.) He later joked that he had demonstrated "impeccable timing" by making this career change so soon after the Three Mile Island nuclear accident in Pennsylvania, US, and said he would "write a book about his experiences if he thought anyone would actually believe them". While working there he wrote his next science fiction novel Strata (1981).

=== Discworld and success (1983–2015) ===
The first Discworld novel, The Colour of Magic, was published in hardback by Colin Smythe Ltd in 1983. The setting would come to dominate his writing career, though he did also publish the serial The Quest for the Keys (1984) using his "Patrick Kearns" pen name the following year; the final work under the moniker.

Pratchett gave up working for the CEGB to make his living through writing in 1987, after finishing the fourth Discworld novel, Mort. His sales increased quickly and many of his books occupied top places on bestseller lists; he was the UK's bestselling author of the 1990s. According to The Times, Pratchett was the top-selling and highest earning UK author in 1996. Some of his books were published by Doubleday, another Transworld imprint. He began writing two books per year after becoming a full time writer, aiming to write 1,000 words per day alongside his schedule of public appearances and marketing work.

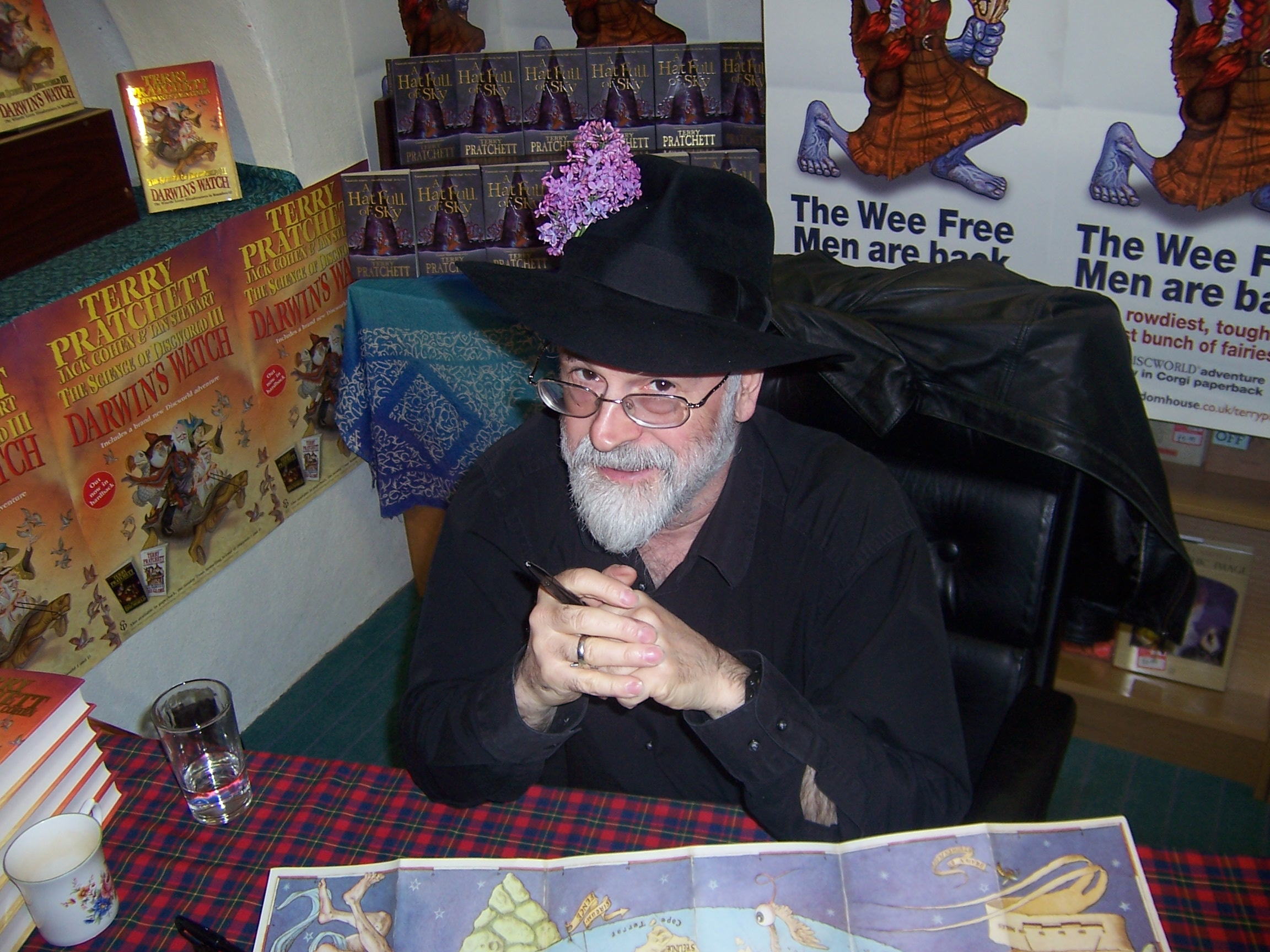
Pratchett at a signing for Darwin's Watch, 2005

In the 2000s he reduced the schedule to a single book per year. His works began to take on a darker tone with deeper consideration of their themes. According to the Bookseller's Pocket Yearbook, in 2003 Pratchett's UK sales amounted to 3.4% of the fiction market by hardback sales and 3.8% by value, putting him in second place behind J. K. Rowling (6% and 5.6%, respectively), while in the paperback sales list Pratchett came 5th with 1.2% and 1.3% by value (behind James Patterson (1.9% and 1.7%), Alexander McCall Smith, John Grisham and J. R. R. Tolkien). In 2005, Thud! became Pratchett's first New York Times bestseller.

His diagnosis with Alzheimer's disease in 2007 affected his writing. Statistical analysis of his works has indicated a decline in the variation of his vocabulary beginning in 1998; indicating that there had been a decade-long preclinical period, something unnoticed by readers and possibly himself. His experience was primarily one of physical rather than mental decline; this led him to rely upon dictation and a personal assistant in his later years as he could no longer type. His final works were nonetheless both critically and commercially successful; Snuff (2011) became the third-fastest-selling hardback adult-readership novel since records began in the UK, selling 55,000 copies in the first three days. His final work was The Shepherd's Crown (2015), published after his death.

As of 2023, Pratchett's works have sold more than 100 million copies in 43 languages.

== Personal life ==
Pratchett married Lyn Purves at the Congregational Church, Gerrards Cross, on 5 October 1968. On his honeymoon he grew the beard he would wear for the rest of his life. They moved to Rowberrow, Somerset, in 1970. Their daughter Rhianna Pratchett, also a writer, was born there in 1976. In 1993 the family moved to Broad Chalke, a village west of Salisbury, Wiltshire.

Pratchett was the patron of the Friends of High Wycombe Library. In 2013 he gave a talk at Beaconsfield Library, which he had visited as a child, and donated the income from the event to it. He also visited his former school to speak to the students.

Pratchett often wore large black hats, in a style described as "more that of urban cowboy than city gent". Concern for the future of civilisation prompted him to install five kilowatts of photovoltaic cells (for solar energy) at his house in 2007.

Pratchett had an observatory built in his back garden and was a keen astronomer from childhood. He made a 2005 appearance on the BBC programme The Sky at Night and appeared on the 50th anniversary of the show in 2007. He travelled on a cruise ship from Taiwan to watch the 2009 solar eclipse.

=== Computing ===
Pratchett started to use computers for writing as soon as they were available to him. His first computer was a ZX81; the first computer he used properly for writing was an Amstrad CPC 464, later replaced by an IBM PC compatible. Pratchett was one of the first authors to routinely use the Internet to communicate with fans, and was a contributor to the Usenet newsgroup alt.fan.pratchett from 1992. However, he did not consider the Internet a hobby, just another "thing to use". He had many computers in his house, with a bank of six monitors to ease writing. When he travelled, he always took a portable computer, originally a 1992 Olivetti Quaderno, with him to write.

In a 1995 interview with Microsoft co-founder Bill Gates, Pratchett expressed concern about the potential spread of misinformation online. He felt that there was a "kind of parity of esteem of information" on the internet, and gave the example of Holocaust denial being presented on the same terms as peer-reviewed research, with no easy way to gauge reliability. Gates disagreed, saying that online authorities would index and check facts and sources in a much more sophisticated way than in print. The interview was rediscovered in 2019, and seen by Pratchett's biographer as prescient of fake news.

Pratchett was an avid video game player, and collaborated in the creation of a number of game adaptations of his books. He favoured games that are "intelligent and have some depth", citing Half-Life 2 (2004) and fan missions for Thief as examples. The red army in Interesting Times prompted comparisons to the 1991 puzzle game Lemmings. When asked about this connection, Pratchett said: "Merely because the red army can fight, dig, march and climb and is controlled by little icons? Can't imagine how anyone thought that ... Not only did I wipe Lemmings from my hard disk, I overwrote it so I couldn't get it back." He described The Elder Scrolls IV: Oblivion (2006) as his favourite video game, saying that he used many of its non-combat-oriented fan-made mods, and contributed to the development of at least one popular fan-made mod.

=== Natural history ===
Pratchett had a fascination with natural history that he referred to many times, and he owned a greenhouse full of carnivorous plants. He described them in the biographical notes on the dust jackets of some of his books, and elsewhere, as "not as interesting as people think". By Carpe Jugulum the account had become that "he used to grow carnivorous plants, but now they've taken over the greenhouse and he avoids going in".

In 1995, a fossil of a sea-turtle from the Eocene epoch of New Zealand was named Psephophorus terrypratchetti in his honour by the paleontologist Richard Köhler (his Discworld being a flat planet balanced on the backs of four elephants which in turn stand on the back of a giant turtle).

In 2016, Pratchett fans unsuccessfully petitioned the International Union of Pure and Applied Chemistry (IUPAC) to name chemical element 117, temporarily called ununseptium, as octarine with the proposed symbol Oc (pronounced "ook"). The final name chosen for element 117 was tennessine with the symbol Ts.

Pratchett was a trustee for the Orangutan Foundation but was pessimistic about the future of orangutans. His activities included visiting Borneo with a Channel 4 film crew to make an episode of Jungle Quest in 1995, seeing orangutans in their natural habitat. Following Pratchett's lead, fan events such as the Discworld Conventions have adopted Orangutan Foundation as their nominated charity, which has been acknowledged by the foundation. One of Pratchett's most popular fictional characters, the Librarian, is a wizard who was transformed into an orangutan in a magical accident and decides to remain in that condition as it is so convenient for his work.

=== Views on religion ===
Pratchett, who was brought up in a Church of England family, described himself as an atheist and a humanist. He was a Distinguished Supporter of Humanists UK (formerly known as the British Humanist Association) and an Honorary Associate of the National Secular Society.

Pratchett wrote that he read the Old Testament as a child and "was horrified", but liked the New Testament and thought that Jesus "had a lot of good things to say ... But I could never see the two testaments as one coherent narrative". He then read Charles Darwin's On the Origin of Species, which "all made perfect sense ... Evolution was far more thrilling to me than the biblical account." He said that he had never disliked religion and thought it had a purpose in human evolution. In an interview Pratchett cites a quotation from the protagonist in his novel Nation, "It is better to build a seismograph than to worship the volcano", a statement Pratchett said he agreed with.

Pratchett told The Times in 2008: "I believe in the same God that Einstein did ... And it is just possible that once you have got past all the gods that we have created with big beards and many human traits, just beyond all that on the other side of physics, there just may be the ordered structure from which everything flows." In an interview on Front Row he described an experience of hearing his dead father's voice and feeling a sense of peace. Commentators took these statements to mean that Pratchett had become religious, but Pratchett responded in an article published in the Daily Mail in which he denied that he had found God, and clarified that he believed the voice had come from a memory of his father and a sense of personal elation.

=== Alzheimer's disease diagnosis ===
In August 2007, Pratchett was misdiagnosed as having had a minor stroke a few years before, which doctors believed had damaged the right side of his brain. In December 2007, he announced that he had been diagnosed with early-onset Alzheimer's disease, which had been responsible for the "stroke". He had a rare form of posterior cortical atrophy (PCA), a disease in which areas at the back of the brain begin to shrink and shrivel.

Describing the diagnosis as an "embuggerance" in a radio interview, Pratchett appealed to people to "keep things cheerful" and proclaimed that "we are taking it fairly philosophically down here and possibly with a mild optimism". He stated he felt he had time for "at least a few more books yet", and added that while he understood the impulse to ask "is there anything I can do?", in this case he would only entertain such offers from "very high-end experts in brain chemistry". Discussing his diagnosis at the Bath Literature Festival in early 2008, Pratchett revealed that by then he found it too difficult to write dedications when signing books. In his later years Pratchett wrote by dictating to his assistant, Rob Wilkins, or by using speech-recognition software.

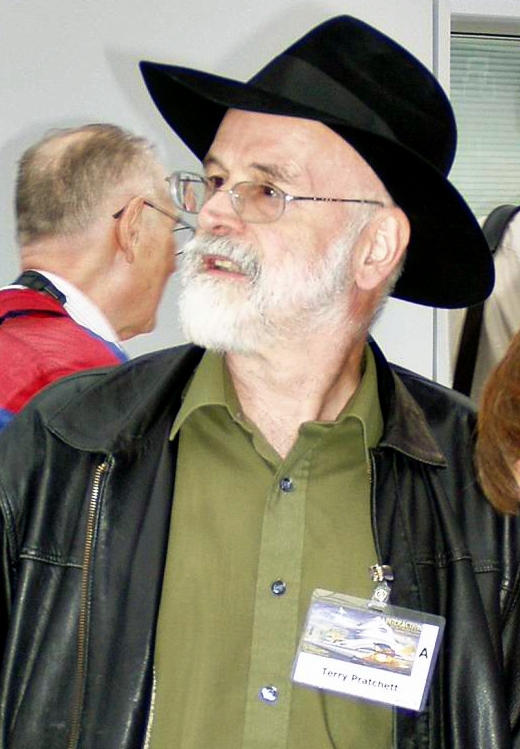
Pratchett at the 63rd World Science Fiction Convention in Glasgow, August 2005

In March 2008, Pratchett announced he was donating £494,000 to the Alzheimer's Research Trust, and that he was shocked "to find out that funding for Alzheimer's research is just 3% of that to find cancer cures". He said: "I am, along with many others, scrabbling to stay ahead long enough to be there when the cure comes along."

In April 2008, Pratchett worked with the BBC to make a two-part documentary series about his illness, Terry Pratchett: Living With Alzheimer's. The first part was broadcast on BBC Two on 4 February 2009, drawing 2.6 million viewers and a 10.4% audience share. The second, broadcast on 11 February 2009, drew 1.72 million viewers and a 6.8% audience share. The documentary won a BAFTA award in the Factual Series category.

On 26 November 2008, Pratchett met Prime Minister Gordon Brown and asked for an increase in dementia-research funding. Pratchett tested a prototype device to address his condition. The ability of the device to alter the course of the illness has been met with scepticism from Alzheimer's researchers.

In an article published in 2009 Pratchett stated that he wished to die by assisted suicide (a term he disliked) before his disease progressed to a critical point. He later said that he felt "it should be possible for someone stricken with a serious and ultimately fatal illness to choose to die peacefully with medical help, rather than suffer". Pratchett was selected to give the 2010 BBC Richard Dimbleby Lecture, Shaking Hands With Death, broadcast on 1 February 2010. Pratchett introduced his lecture on the topic of assisted death (he preferred this to the term "assisted suicide"), but the main text was read by his friend Tony Robinson because his condition made it difficult for him to read. In June 2011, Pratchett presented a BBC television documentary, Terry Pratchett: Choosing to Die, about assisted suicide. It won the Best Documentary award at the Scottish BAFTAs in November 2011.

In September 2012, Pratchett told an interviewer: "I have to tell you that I thought I'd be a lot worse than this by now, and so did my specialist." In the same interview he said that the cognitive part of his mind was "untouched" and his symptoms were physical (normal for PCA). However, in July 2014 he cancelled his appearance at the biennial International Discworld Convention, citing his condition and "other age-related ailments".

=== Death and legacy ===
Pratchett died at his home from complications of Alzheimer's disease on the morning of 12 March 2015. He was 66 years old. The Telegraph reported an unidentified source as saying that, despite his previous discussion of assisted suicide, his death had been natural. After Pratchett's death, his assistant, Rob Wilkins, wrote from the official Terry Pratchett Twitter account:

AT LAST, SIR TERRY, WE MUST WALK TOGETHER.

Terry took Death's arm and followed him through the doors and on to the black desert under the endless night.

The End.

Public figures who paid tribute included Prime Minister David Cameron, the comedian Ricky Gervais, and the authors Ursula K. Le Guin, Terry Brooks, Margaret Atwood, George R. R. Martin and Neil Gaiman. Pratchett was memorialised in graffiti in East London. The video game companies Frontier Developments and Valve added elements to their games named after him. Users of the social news site Reddit organised a tribute by which an HTTP header, "X-Clacks-Overhead: GNU Terry Pratchett", was added to websites' responses, a reference to the Discworld novel Going Postal, in which "the clacks" (a semaphore system, used as Discworld's equivalent to the telegraph) are programmed to repeat the name of its creator's deceased son; the sentiment in the novel is that no one is ever forgotten as long as their name is still spoken. A June 2015 web server survey reported that approximately 84,000 websites had been configured with the header. Pratchett's humanist funeral service was held in Salisbury on 25 March 2015.

In 2015, Pratchett's estate announced an endowment in perpetuity to the University of South Australia. The Sir Terry Pratchett Memorial Scholarship supports a Masters scholarship at the university's Hawke Research Institute. In 2023, several stories published in a regional newspaper between 1970 and 1975 under the pen name Patrick Kearns were discovered to have been authored by Pratchett. They were published along with a handful of other uncollected stories as A Stroke of the Pen: The Lost Stories in October 2023.

== Awards and honours ==
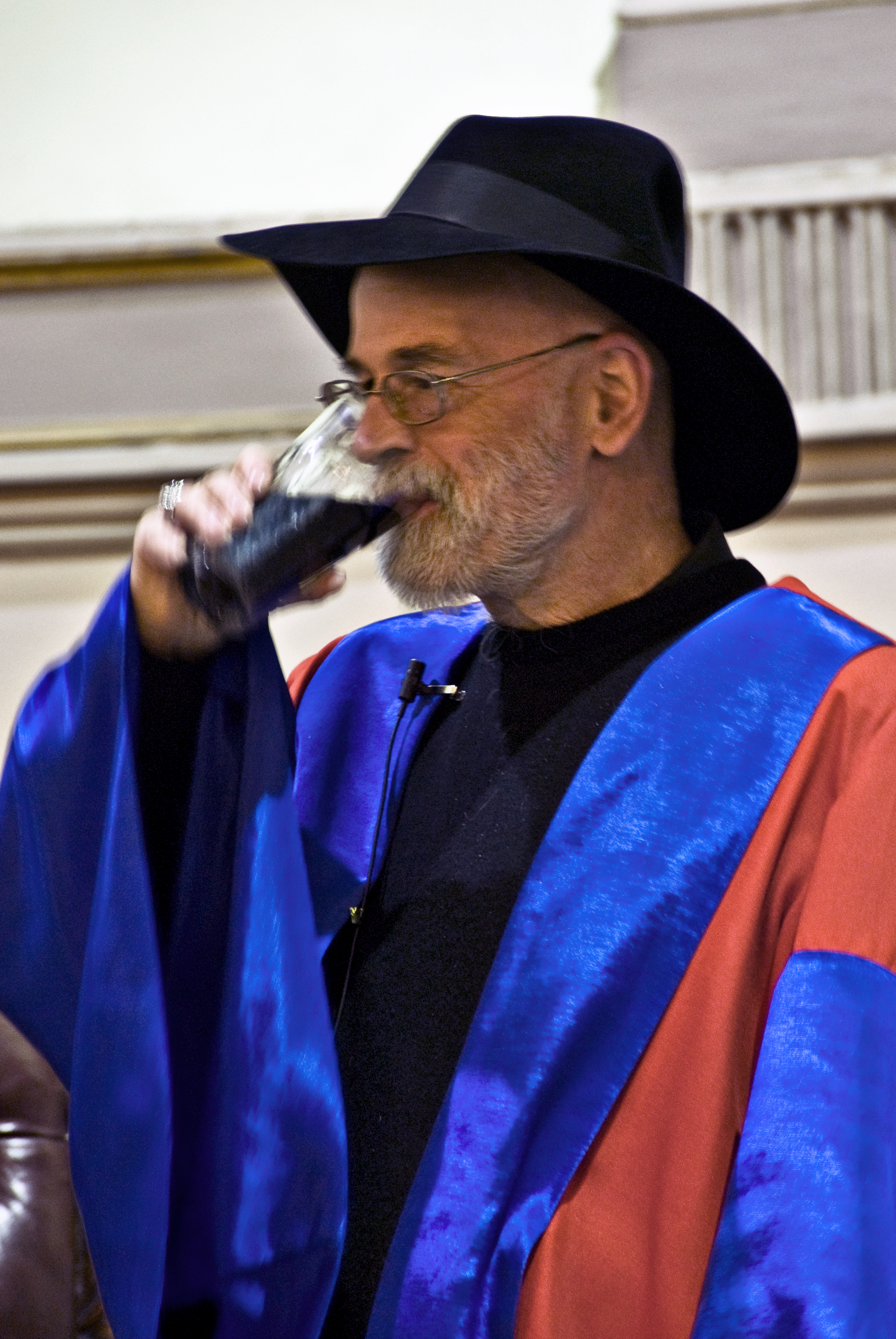
Pratchett drinking Irish stout shortly after receiving an honorary degree from Trinity College Dublin, in 2008

Pratchett received a knighthood for "services to literature" in the 2009 UK New Year Honours list. He was previously appointed Officer of the Order of the British Empire, also for "services to literature", in 1998. He formally received the accolade at Buckingham Palace on 18 February 2009. Pratchett commented in the Ansible science fiction/fan newsletter, "I suspect the 'services to literature' consisted of refraining from trying to write any", but added, "Still, I cannot help feeling mightily chuffed about it." On 31 December 2008, it was announced that Pratchett would be knighted (as a Knight Bachelor) in the Queen's 2009 New Year Honours. Afterwards he said, "You can't ask a fantasy writer not to want a knighthood. You know, for two pins I'd get myself a horse and a sword." In 2010, Pratchett created his own sword from deposits of iron he had found in a field near his home as he believed a knight should have a sword.

Ten honorary doctorates were conferred on Pratchett: from the University of Warwick in 1999, the University of Portsmouth in 2001, the University of Bath in 2003, the University of Bristol in 2004, Buckinghamshire New University in 2008, the University of Dublin in 2008, Bradford University in 2009, University of Winchester in 2009, The Open University in 2013 for his contribution to Public Service and his last, from the University of South Australia, in May 2014. Pratchett was made an adjunct Professor in the School of English at Trinity College Dublin in 2010, with a role in postgraduate education in creative writing and popular literature.

Pratchett won the British Book Awards' "Fantasy and Science Fiction Author of the Year" category in 1994, the British Science Fiction Award in 1989 for his novel Pyramids, and a Locus Award for Best Fantasy Novel in 2008 for Making Money. He won the 2001 Carnegie Medal from the British librarians, which recognised The Amazing Maurice and His Educated Rodents as the year's best children's book published in the UK. Night Watch won the 2003 Prometheus Award for best libertarian novel. Four of the five Discworld novels that centre on the trainee witch Tiffany Aching won the annual Locus Award for Best Young Adult Book in 2004, 2005, 2007 and 2016. In 2005, Going Postal was shortlisted for the Hugo Award for Best Novel; however, Pratchett recused himself, stating that stress over the award would mar his enjoyment of Worldcon. In the same year, A Hat Full of Sky won a Mythopoeic Award. In 2008, Making Money was nominated for the Nebula Award for Best Novel. I Shall Wear Midnight won the 2010 Andre Norton Award, presented by the Science Fiction and Fantasy Writers of America (SFWA) as a part of the Nebula Award ceremony.

In 2016 SFWA named Pratchett the recipient of the Kate Wilhelm Solstice Award, given for "significant impact on the science fiction or fantasy landscape". He received the NESFA Skylark Award in 2009 and the World Fantasy Award for Life Achievement in 2010. In 2011 he won Margaret A. Edwards Award from the American Library Association, a lifetime honour for "significant and lasting contribution to young adult literature". The librarians cited nine Discworld novels published from 1983 to 2004 and observed that "Pratchett's tales of Discworld have won over generations of teen readers with intelligence, heart, and undeniable wit. Comic adventures that fondly mock the fantasy genre, the Discworld novels expose the hypocrisies of contemporary society in an intricate, ever-expanding universe. With satisfyingly multilayered plots, Pratchett's humor honors the intelligence of the reader. Teens eagerly lose themselves in a universe with no maps." In 2003 the BBC conducted The Big Read to identify the "Nation's Best-loved Novel" and finally published a ranked list of the "Top 200". Pratchett's highest-ranking novel was Mort, number 65, but he and Charles Dickens were the only authors with five in the Top 100 (four of his were from the Discworld series). He also led all authors with fifteen novels in the Top 200.

An asteroid (127005 Pratchett) is named after Pratchett, as is the Australian spider Anelosimus pratchetti. In 2013 Pratchett was named Humanist of the Year by the British Humanist Association for his campaign to fund research into Alzheimers, his contribution to the right to die public debate and his Humanist values. Pratchett's Discworld novels have led to dedicated conventions, the first in Manchester in 1996, then worldwide, often with the author as guest of honour. Publication of a new novel was sometimes accompanied by an international book-signing tour; queues were known to stretch outside the bookshop as he continued to sign books well after the intended finishing time. His fans were not restricted by age or gender, and he received a large amount of fan mail from them. Pratchett enjoyed meeting fans and hearing what they think about his books, saying that since he was well paid for his novels, his fans were "everything" to him.

In March 2017, Beaconsfield Town Council commissioned a commemorative plaque dedicated to Pratchett for Beaconsfield Library.

=== Coat of Arms ===
In 2010, Pratchett was granted his own coat of arms following his knighthood. The arms were designed by Hubert Chesshyre and granted by Letters Patent of Garter and Clarenceux Kings of Arms. The owl is a morepork, which taken together with the ankh is a reference to the city of Ankh-Morpork. The image of a morpork holding an ankh appears in the fictional Ankh-Morpork City Arms. The motto "Noli Timere Messorem" is a corrected version of the dog Latin "Non Temetis Messor", (Note: ‘Don’t Fear the Reaper’ – a Blue Oyster Cult song title, and also the motto of the Duchy of Sto Helit, i.e. Mort and Ysabell in Mort and their daughter Susan. (Hogfather) Probably it should be timetis rather than temetis.) the motto of Death's son-in-law and former apprentice, Mort of Sto Helit and his heirs. The phrase is a reference to the song "(Don't Fear) The Reaper" by Blue Öyster Cult.

Coat of arms of Terry Pratchett
Notes Terry Pratchett's arms were designed by Hubert Chesshyre and granted by Letters Patent of Garter and Clarenceux Kings of Arms dated 28 April 2010. Crest Upon a Helm with a Wreath Argent and Sable on Water Barry wavy Sable Argent and Sable an Owl affronty wings displayed and inverted Or supporting thereby two closed Books erect Gules. Escutcheon Sable an ankh between four Roundels in saltire each issuing Argent. Motto Noli Timere Messorem (Don't fear the reaper) Symbolism The owl is a morepork, which taken together with the ankh is a reference to the city of Ankh-Morpork. The image of a morpork holding an ankh appears in the fictional Ankh-Morpork City Arms. The motto "Noli Timere Messorem" is a corrected version of the dog Latin "Non Temetis Messor", the motto of Death's son-in-law and former apprentice, Mort of Sto Helit and his heirs. The phrase is a reference to the song "(Don't Fear) The Reaper" by Blue Öyster Cult.

== Writing ==
Pratchett said that to write, one must read extensively, both inside and outside one's chosen genre and to the point of "overflow". He advised that writing is hard work, and that writers must "make grammar, punctuation and spelling a part of your life". However, Pratchett enjoyed writing, regarding its monetary rewards as "an unavoidable consequence" rather than the reason for writing.

=== Fantasy genre ===
Although during his early career he wrote for the science fiction and horror genres, Pratchett later focused almost entirely on fantasy, and said: "It is easier to bend the universe around the story." In the acceptance speech for his Carnegie Medal, he said: "Fantasy isn't just about wizards and silly wands. It's about seeing the world from new directions", pointing to the Harry Potter novels and The Lord of the Rings. In the same speech, he acknowledged benefits of these works for the genre.

Pratchett believed he owed "a debt to the science fiction/fantasy genre which he grew up out of" and disliked the term "magical realism", which, he said, is "like a polite way of saying you write fantasy and is more acceptable to certain people". He expressed annoyance that fantasy is "unregarded as a literary form", arguing that it "is the oldest form of fiction"; he said he was infuriated when novels containing science fiction or fantasy ideas were not regarded as part of those genres. He debated this issue with novelist A. S. Byatt and critic Terry Eagleton, arguing that fantasy is fundamental to the way we understand the world and therefore an integral aspect of all fiction.

=== Style and themes ===
Pratchett's earliest Discworld novels were written largely to parody classic sword-and-sorcery fiction (and occasionally science fiction); as the series progressed, Pratchett dispensed with parody almost entirely, and the Discworld series evolved into straightforward (though still comedic) satire.

Pratchett had a tendency to avoid using chapters, arguing in a Book Sense interview that "life does not happen in regular chapters, nor do movies, and Homer did not write in chapters", adding "I'm blessed if I know what function they serve in books for adults". However, there were exceptions; Going Postal and Making Money and several of his books for younger readers are divided into chapters. Pratchett said that he used chapters in the young adult novels because "[his] editor screams until [he] does", but otherwise felt that they were an unnecessary "stopping point" that got in the way of the narrative.

Characters, place names, and titles in Pratchett's books often contain puns, allusions and cultural references. Some characters are parodies of well-known characters: for example, Pratchett's character Cohen the Barbarian, also called Ghengiz Cohen, is a parody of Conan the Barbarian and Genghis Khan, and his character Leonard of Quirm is a parody of Leonardo da Vinci.

Another feature of his writing is the use of dialogue in small capitals, without quotation marks, for utterances by the character Death.

Pratchett was an only child, and his characters are often without siblings. Pratchett explained, "In fiction only children are the interesting ones."

Discworld novels often included a modern innovation and its introduction to the world's medieval setting, such as a public police force (Guards! Guards!), guns (Men at Arms), cinema (Moving Pictures), investigative journalism (The Truth), the postage stamp (Going Postal), modern banking (Making Money), and the steam engine (Raising Steam). The "clacks", the tower-to-tower semaphore system that sprang up in later novels, is a mechanical optical telegraph (as created by the Chappe brothers and employed during the French Revolution) before wired electric telegraph chains, with all the change and turmoil that such an advancement implies. The resulting social upheaval driven by these changes serves as the setting for the main story.

=== Influences ===
Pratchett's earliest inspirations were The Wind in the Willows by Kenneth Grahame, and the works of H. G. Wells, Isaac Asimov and Arthur C. Clarke. His literary influences were P. G. Wodehouse, Tom Sharpe, Jerome K. Jerome, Roy Lewis, Alan Coren, G. K. Chesterton, William Shakespeare, and Mark Twain.

== Works ==
=== Discworld ===
The Discworld series consists of 41 novels and a variety of supporting material. Pratchett began writing the Discworld series in order to "have fun with some of the cliches". The Discworld is a large disc resting on the backs of four giant elephants, all supported by the giant turtle Great A'Tuin as it swims its way through space. The books were published essentially in chronological order, and advancements can be seen in the development of the Discworld civilisations, such as the creation of paper money in Ankh-Morpork.

==== The Science of Discworld ====
Pratchett wrote four Science of Discworld books in collaboration with professor of mathematics Ian Stewart and reproductive biologist Jack Cohen, both of the University of Warwick: The Science of Discworld (1999), The Science of Discworld II: The Globe (2002), The Science of Discworld III: Darwin's Watch (2005), and The Science of Discworld IV: Judgement Day (2013).

All four books have chapters that alternate between fiction and non-fiction: the fictional chapters are set within the Discworld universe, where characters observe, and experiment on, a universe with the same physics as ours. The non-fiction chapters (written by Stewart and Cohen) explain the science behind the fictional events.

In 1999, Pratchett appointed both Cohen and Stewart as "Honorary Wizards of the Unseen University" at the same ceremony at which the University of Warwick awarded him an honorary degree.

==== Folklore of Discworld ====
Pratchett collaborated with the folklorist Jacqueline Simpson on The Folklore of Discworld (2008), a study of the relationship between many of the persons, places and events described in the Discworld books and their counterparts in myths, legends, fairy tales and folk customs on Earth.

=== Other writing ===
Pratchett's first two adult novels, The Dark Side of the Sun (1976) and Strata (1981), were both science fiction, the latter taking place partly on a disc-shaped world. Subsequent to these, Pratchett mostly concentrated on his Discworld series and novels for children, with two exceptions: Good Omens (1990), a collaboration with Neil Gaiman (which was nominated for both Locus and World Fantasy Awards in 1991), a humorous story about the Apocalypse set on Earth, and Nation (2008), a book for young adults.

After writing Good Omens Pratchett brainstormed with Larry Niven on a story that became the short novel "Rainbow Mars". Niven eventually completed the story on his own, but he states in the afterword that a number of Pratchett's ideas remained in the finished version. Pratchett also collaborated with the British science fiction author Stephen Baxter on a parallel Earth series. The first novel, entitled The Long Earth was published on 21 June 2012. A second novel, The Long War, was released on 18 June 2013. The Long Mars was published in 2014. The fourth book in the series, The Long Utopia, was published in June 2015, and the fifth, The Long Cosmos, in June 2016.

In 2012, the first volume of Pratchett's collected short fiction was published under the title A Blink of the Screen. In 2014 a similar collection was published of Pratchett's non-fiction, entitled A Slip of the Keyboard. A final collection, A Stroke of the Pen: The Lost Stories, was published in October 2023, collecting 20 stories written by Pratchett for newspapers in the 1970s and 80s under pseudonyms such as "Patrick Kearns" which had not previously been attributed to Pratchett.

Pratchett wrote parts of the dialogue for a mod for the game The Elder Scrolls IV: Oblivion (2006), which added a Nord companion named Vilja. He also worked on a similar mod for The Elder Scrolls V: Skyrim (2011), which featured Vilja's great-great-granddaughter.

=== Children's literature ===
Pratchett's first children's novel was also his first published novel: The Carpet People in 1971, which Pratchett substantially rewrote and re-released in 1992. The next, Truckers (1988), was the first in The Nome Trilogy of novels for young readers (also known as The Bromeliad Trilogy), about small gnome-like creatures called "Nomes", and the trilogy continued in Diggers (1990) and Wings (1990). Subsequently, Pratchett wrote the Johnny Maxwell trilogy, about the adventures of a boy called Johnny Maxwell and his friends, comprising Only You Can Save Mankind (1992), Johnny and the Dead (1993) and Johnny and the Bomb (1996). Nation (2008) marked his return to the non-Discworld children's novel, and this was followed in 2012 by Dodger, a children's novel set in Victorian London. On 21 November 2013 Doubleday Children's released Pratchett's Jack Dodger's Guide to London.

In 2001, he wrote The Amazing Maurice and His Educated Rodents, his first Discworld book marketed for children.

Pratchett also wrote a five-book children's series featuring a trainee witch, Tiffany Aching, and taking place on Discworld, beginning with The Wee Free Men in 2003.

In September 2014, a collection of children's stories, Dragons at Crumbling Castle, written by Pratchett, and illustrated by Mark Beech, was published. This was followed by another collection, The Witch's Vacuum Cleaner, also illustrated by Mark Beech, in 2016. A third volume, Father Christmas's Fake Beard, was released in 2017. A fourth collection, The Time-travelling Caveman, was released in September 2020.

=== Collaborations ===
- The Unadulterated Cat (1989) is a humorous book of cat anecdotes written by Pratchett and illustrated by Gray Jolliffe.
- Good Omens, written with Neil Gaiman (1990)
- Once More* with Footnotes, edited by Priscilla Olson and Sheila M. Perry (2004), is "an assortment of short stories, articles, introductions, and ephemera" by Pratchett which "have appeared in books, magazines, newspapers, anthologies, and program books, many of which are now hard to find". These include the short stories "The Sea and Little Fishes", "Troll Bridge", "The Hades Business", "Final Reward", "Hollywood Chickens", "Turntables of the Night", "Once and Future", and "#ifdef DEBUG + 'world/enough' + 'time'", as well as nonfiction articles.
- The five-book "Long Earth" series written with Stephen Baxter, published between 2012 and 2016 beginning with The Long Earth.

=== Unfinished texts ===
Pratchett's daughter, the writer Rhianna Pratchett, is the custodian of the Discworld franchise. She said that she had no plans to publish her father's unfinished work or continue the Discworld series. Pratchett told Neil Gaiman that anything that he had been working on at the time of his death should be destroyed by a steamroller. On 25 August 2017 his former assistant Rob Wilkins fulfilled this wish by arranging for Pratchett's hard drive to be crushed under a steamroller at the Great Dorset Steam Fair.

According to Wilkins, Pratchett left "an awful lot" of unfinished writing, "10 titles I know of and fragments from many other bits and pieces". Pratchett had mentioned two new texts, Scouting for Trolls and a Discworld novel following a new character. The notes left behind outline ideas about "how the old folk of the Twilight Canyons solve the mystery of a missing treasure and defeat the rise of a Dark Lord despite their failing memories"; "the secret of the crystal cave and the carnivorous plants in the Dark Incontinent", about Constable Feeney of the Watch, first introduced in Snuff, involving how he "solves a whodunnit among the congenitally decent and honest goblins"; and a second book about Amazing Maurice from The Amazing Maurice and His Educated Rodents.

=== Television documentaries ===
- Terry Pratchett's Jungle Quest (1996)
- Terry Pratchett: Living with Alzheimer's (2009)
- Terry Pratchett: Choosing to Die (2011)
- Terry Pratchett: Facing Extinction (2013)
- Terry Pratchett: Back in Black (2017)

== Works about Pratchett ==
A collection of essays about Pratchett's writings is compiled in the book Terry Pratchett: Guilty of Literature, edited by Andrew M. Butler, Edward James and Farah Mendlesohn, published by Science Fiction Foundation in 2000. A second, expanded edition was published by Old Earth Books in 2004. Andrew M. Butler wrote the Pocket Essentials Guide to Terry Pratchett published in 2001. Writers Uncovered: Terry Pratchett is a biography for young readers by Vic Parker, published by Heinemann Library in 2006.

A BBC docudrama based on Pratchett's life, Terry Pratchett: Back in Black, was broadcast in February 2017, starring Paul Kaye as Pratchett. Neil Gaiman was involved with the project which used Pratchett's own words. Pratchett's assistant, Rob Wilkins, said that Pratchett was working on this documentary before he died. According to the BBC, finishing it would "show the author was still having the last laugh".

The English author, critic and performer Marc Burrows wrote an unofficial biography, The Magic of Terry Pratchett, published by Pen and Sword Books on 6 July 2020. Though it was not endorsed by the Pratchett estate, prior to its publication they did wish Burrows "all the best" regarding the book through the official Pratchett Twitter account. It received generally favourable reviews and won the 2021 Locus Award for Non-Fiction.

In 2022, Wilkins wrote the official biography, Terry Pratchett: A Life with Footnotes. The biography was well received. (Note: Attributed to multiple references:) In The Daily Telegraph, Tristram Fane Saunders wrote that it "spins magic from mundanity in precisely the way Pratchett himself did". However, in a review for the Irish Independent, Kevin Power called it more a collection of fan notes than a serious biography.

In April 2023, "Entering Discworld. Population: Terry Pratchett", an episode of the podcast Imaginary Worlds, was released to mark the 75th anniversary of Pratchett's birth. It discussed four of Pratchett's recurring fiction characters as representative of his underlying philosophy.

In 2026, Marc Burrows published the first volume of A Reader's Guide to Terry Pratchett, covering Pratchett's writings from school up to The Fifth Elephant in 1999. Volume two will cover the remainder of his novels from The Truth up to The Shepherd's Crown (a bonus for purchasers from Burrows' website was a companion volume entitled Shorts, Spin Offs & Adaptations - volume one covered from The Quest for the Keys (1984) to Nanny Ogg's Cookbook (1999)). Each chapter examines a book’s themes, cultural setting, and role in Pratchett’s development as a writer, while considering the relationship between his life, his work, and the wider world in which it was created.

- A Reader's Guide to Terry Pratchett: Volume One: 1962-1999 (Pen and Sword Books, 2026, ISBN 978-1-0361-3568-3)

- A Reader's Guide to Terry Pratchett: Shorts, Spin Offs & Adaptations: Volume One (Love/Buzz Books, 2026): This was available with special editions of Volume One of the main Reader's Guide

- A Reader's Guide to Terry Pratchett: Volume Two: 2000-2015 (TBC)

- A Reader's Guide to Terry Pratchett: Shorts, Spin Offs & Adaptations: Volume Two (TBC)

== Works cited ==
- Burrows, Marc (2020). The Magic of Terry Pratchett. White Owl. ISBN 978-1-52676-551-2.
- Cabell, Craig (2011). Terry Pratchett: The Spirit of Fantasy. John Blake. ISBN 978-1-84358-507-7.
- James, Edward (2012). "Tolkien, Lewis and the explosion of genre fantasy". In James, Edward; Mendlesohn, Farah (eds.). The Cambridge Companion to Fantasy Literature. Cambridge University Press. ISBN 978-0-521-42959-7.
- Pyykkonen, Carrie; Washington, Linda (2008). Secrets of The Wee Free Men and Discworld: The Myths and Legends of Terry Pratchett's Multiverse. St. Martin's Griffin. ISBN 978-0-312-37243-9.
