= What's that got to do with the ...? =

Common English expression

"What's that got to do with the price of ...?" is a sarcastic expression denoting annoyance at the irrelevance or non sequitur of someone's comment in a broader discussion. The closing phrase (after "of" in the sentence) can be almost any common or well-known commodity, such as foods (tea, cheese, fish, eggs, bread, bacon, pork), or dry goods (cotton, rope, boots, shotguns). The commodity may also be narrowed down to a location ("price of tea in China").

The most common form, What does that have to do with the price of tea in China?, is a retort to an irrelevant suggestion. This facetious usage implies that the topic under discussion might as well be the price of tea in China for all the relevance the speaker's suggestion bears on it.

There are variations of the opening phrasing, such as:

- What has that to do with the price of...
- What does that have to do with the price of...
- What has that got to do with the price of...
- What's that got to do with... (dropping "price of")
- What does (subject) have to do with...

== History ==
Linguist Pascal Tréguer has traced variations of the phrase back to at least 1832, using various commodities as the comparison. He dates the common variation, the price of tea in China, to 1930, relating it to the late 19th century phrase, not for all the tea in China. The latter phrase indicates totality, and its use in the sarcastic version might emphasize the mocking tone ("what does your statement have to do with anything whatsoever"). Prior to 1930, other versions of the price of tea in China variation do exist, as far back as 1895, though not using the same phrasing as the subject of this article, and perhaps meant as a straight question, and not an objection.

== Variations ==
Many variations of the phrase exist in English.

What's that got to do with the price of tea in China? appears to be the most common version in American English. A common variation is "What's that got to do with the price of eggs?", dating back to the 1920s, and possibly the progenitor of "What's that got to do with the price of fish?" Another common version is "What's that got to do with the price of cheese?", "Bread" is also an alternative. Another version can be found in the fantasy novel The Last Continent by Terry Pratchett, with the quote being "What's that got to do with the price of feet."
