= Eric (novel) =

1990 Discworld novel by Terry Pratchett

- First edition
- Author: Terry Pratchett
- Illustrator: Josh Kirby
- Language: English
- Series: Discworld; 9th novel – 4th Rincewind story
- Subject: Faust, Dante's Inferno, Homer's Iliad, Trojan War; Characters: Rincewind, The Luggage, Eric Thursley; Locations: Hell, Tezumen Empire, Tsort
- Genre: Fantasy
- Publisher: Victor Gollancz / Corgi
- Publication date: 1990
- ISBN: 0-575-04636-8 ISBN 0-575-05191-4 (non-illustrated)
- Preceded by: Guards! Guards!
- Followed by: Moving Pictures

Eric, stylized as ~~Faust~~ Eric, is the ninth Discworld novel by Terry Pratchett. It was originally published in 1990 as a "Discworld story", in a larger format than the other novels and illustrated by Josh Kirby. It was later reissued as a normal paperback without any illustrations, and in some cases, with the title given on the cover and title pages simply as Eric. (The page headers, however, continued to alternate between ~~Faust~~ and Eric.)

== Plot summary ==
The story is a parody of the tale of Faust, and follows the events of Sourcery in which the Wizard Rincewind was trapped in the Dungeon Dimensions. Rincewind is summoned by the thirteen-year-old demonologist, Eric Thursley, who wanted a demon to grant his heart's desires. He is disappointed when Rincewind tells him he is unable to grant wishes. Rincewind is disheartened to learn that the spells to confine demons work on him; Eric's parrot tells him that because he was summoned as a demon, he is subject to the same terms. The arrival of Rincewind's Luggage causes Eric to suspect deceit on Rincewind's part. Eric's demands are renewed and Rincewind finds that snapping his fingers allows him to grant the following wishes.

- To be Ruler of the World. Eric and Rincewind are transported to the rain forests of Klatch in the Tezumen empire (a parody of the Aztec Empire). The locals declare Eric Ruler of the World. During this tribute, Rincewind and the parrot explore the temple of Quezovercoatl (a parody of Quetzalcoatl), where they find a prisoner, Ponce da Quirm (a parody of Juan Ponce de León), who is to be sacrificed. Da Quirm tells Rincewind about the terrible fate the Tezumen have planned for the Ruler of the World, on whom they blame all of life's misfortunes. Rincewind, Eric and da Quirm are tied up at the top of a pyramid to be sacrificed, when Quezovercoatl makes his appearance. Unfortunately for him, the Luggage also makes an appearance, trampling the six-inch-tall Quezovercoatl in the process. The Tezumen, pleased to see Quezovercoatl destroyed, release the prisoners and deify the Luggage in the place of their god.
- To Meet the Most Beautiful Woman in All History. Rincewind transports himself and Eric inside in a large wooden horse (a parody of the Trojan Horse). Exiting, they are surrounded by Tsortean soldiers, who take them for an Ephebian invasion force. Rincewind manages to talk their way out from the guards and out of the city, only to fall into the hands of the invading army. Rincewind and Eric are taken to Lavaeolus (a parody of Odysseus), the man who built the horse as a decoy so that he and his men could sneak in while their enemies waited around the horse for them to come out. They re-enter Tsort through a secret passage, and find Elenor (a parody of Helen of Troy). Eric and Lavaeolus are disappointed to find that Elenor is now a plump mother of several children, and that artistic licence had been taken in her description. The Ephebians escape the city while Tsort burns, and Lavaeolus and his army set out for home. Eric notes that "Lavaeolus" in Ephebian translates to "Rinser of Winds", hinting that Lavaeolus is an ancestor of Rincewind.
- To Live Forever. Rincewind brings Eric and him outside time, just before the beginning of existence. They meet the Creator, who is just forming the Discworld. Rincewind and Eric are left on the newly formed world, with the realisation that "to live forever" means to live for all time, from start to finish. To escape, Rincewind has Eric reverse his summoning, taking them both to hell.

They discover hell steeped in bureaucracy, the Demon King Astfgl having decided that boredom might be the ultimate form of torture. Rincewind uses his university experience to confuse the demons, so he and Eric can escape. While crossing through the recently reformed levels of hell (satirical forms of Dante's Inferno) they encounter da Quirm and the parrot, as well as Lavaeolus, who tells them where the exit is.

The source of Rincewind's demonic powers is revealed to be Lord Vassenego, a Demon Lord leading a secret revolt against Astfgl. Using Rincewind to keep Astfgl occupied while gathering support amongst the demons, Vassenego confronts his king just as Astfgl finally catches up to Rincewind and Eric. Vassenego announces the council of demons has made Astfgl "Supreme Life President of Hell", and that he is to plan out the course of action for demons. With Astfgl lost in the bureaucratic prison of his own making, Vassenego takes over as king and lets Rincewind and Eric escape, so that stories about hell can be told. As they leave, Rincewind and Eric notice that the path they are fleeing along has good intentions written on each cobble.

== Reception ==
Starburst has called it "a series of hilarious pokes at the cliché that is hell". Gardner Dozois, conversely, considered it "downright bad, the only Discworld book [he] actively disliked and found a chore to read". In 2011 The novel was included in the "Gollancz 50" series. The series marked the publisher's 50th anniversary by re-issuing seminal works of science fiction.

== In other media ==
- An audio serialization of the novel, in four episodes of about fifteen minutes each, was broadcast on BBC Radio 4 in March 2013.

Reading order guide
Preceded by Guards! Guards!	9th Discworld Novel	Succeeded by Moving Pictures
Preceded by Sourcery	4th Rincewind Story; Published in 1990	Succeeded by Interesting Times
