= Interesting Times =

1994 Discworld novel by Terry Pratchett

- First edition
- Author: Terry Pratchett
- Cover artist: Josh Kirby
- Language: English
- Series: Discworld; 17th novel – 5th Rincewind story
- Subject: Imperial China, sakoku; Characters: Rincewind, Twoflower, The Luggage, Cohen the Barbarian; Locations: Agatean Empire
- Genre: Fantasy
- Publisher: Victor Gollancz Ltd
- Publication date: 1994
- ISBN: 0-575-05800-5
- Preceded by: Soul Music
- Followed by: Maskerade

Interesting Times is a fantasy novel by British writer Terry Pratchett. It is the seventeenth book in the Discworld series and is set in the Aurient (a fictional analogue of the Orient).

The title refers to the English expression, "may you live in interesting times", which is typically presented as a translation from a purported Chinese curse.

== Plot ==
Two gods, Fate and the Lady, oppose each other in a game over the outcome of the struggle for the throne of the Agatean Empire on the Counterweight Continent.

The Patrician of Ankh-Morpork receives a demand that the "Great Wizzard" be sent to the distant Agatean Empire, and he orders Archchancellor Mustrum Ridcully of Unseen University to comply. As the spelling, "Wizzard," matches that on Rincewind's hat, the faculty decide to send him. Using the machine Hex, they teleport him to the University from a desert island where he has been living since the events of Eric. They offer him the right to call himself a Wizard, which he never actually earned, if he agrees to be sent to Agatea. Teleportation requires an exchange of mass, and they end up exchanging him with a very heavy live cannon (which they extinguish upon its arrival). This results in Rincewind arriving in Agatea at a very high speed, but he lands safely in a snowbank.

Rincewind's efforts to run from any kind of danger quickly embroil him in momentous events. He encounters his friend Cohen the Barbarian, now accompanied by a "Silver Horde" of elderly warriors and Ronald Saveloy, a former teacher. Cohen is planning to infiltrate the Empire and live a luxurious retirement by taking over as Emperor. Rincewind learns that the first Agatean Emperor supposedly conquered the land with the assistance of a "Great Wizard" and a "Red Army." Now, a new "Red Army" movement of young people, dedicated mainly to the promulgation of mildly worded slogans, has been inspired by a supposed revolutionary tract, which turns out to be a travelogue of Ankh-Morpork written by Rincewind's former traveling companion Twoflower, whom Rincewind frees from a dungeon and whose two daughters are leaders of the Red Army. It turns out that the villainous Grand Vizier, Lord Hong, has made the harmless Red Army appear to be a threat to the Empire and had Rincewind brought to Agatea so that he could blame the problems on foreigners, then put the "revolution" down violently and turn to the conquest of Ankh-Morpork, whose culture he secretly seeks to emulate. When Hong murders the Emperor with the intention of framing the Red Army, it creates the opportunity needed by the Silver Horde to infiltrate the palace. Cohen and Saveloy had hoped to conquer the Empire by simply installing Cohen as Emperor, since almost nobody has ever seen the Emperor's face. But Lord Hong leads four other lords who had been vying against him for the throne to rally their armies against the Horde, to the chagrin of Saveloy who had been trying to civilize the barbarians.

Before the battle begins, Rincewind attempts to tip the balance in the Horde's favor by spreading rumors amongst the encamped armies that the Horde is being supported by an army of 'invisible vampire ghosts', who Agateans believe inhabit the lands outside of the Empire. Since this belief is officially endorsed by the imperial authorities to maintain domestic order, dispelling the rumour proves difficult. As the battle begins, Rincewind inadvertently discovers the actual Red Army, a multitude of terra cotta warriors that can be controlled by magical armor that he accidentally dons. The automatons destroy the Agatean forces. However, Rincewind inadvertently wanders into a ditch and begins to sink. He realizes that the magic boots are weighing him down, and frees himself with Twoflower's help. Cohen realizes that he is now recognized as the Emperor, and prepares proclamations to relax the regime's oppression of the people. He invites Rincewind to serve as Chief Wizard and found his own university, which convinces Rincewind that something horrible is about to happen. Indeed, Lord Hong takes Rincewind hostage and plans to murder him on the steps of the palace. Just then, the faculty of Unseen University teleport Rincewind away. Twoflower challenges Hong to a duel, as his wife was killed in a battle waged by Hong. The cannon, re-lit by the faculty, then arrives and kills both Hong and Saveloy; Saveloy, despite never having managed to be a barbarian in life, decides to go to the warrior's afterlife.

The Luggage had followed Rincewind to its native Agatea, but became distracted by meeting and mating with a female Luggage. Upon Rincewind's disappearance, the Luggage leaves its mate and their offspring to once again follow its owner.

The Lady has won the game against Fate. She also interfered in Hex's calculations so that Rincewind is teleported to the unexplored continent of XXXX where he lands safely, while an XXXXian kangaroo (instead of Rincewind) suffers a fatal collision with a wall at Unseen University. Rincewind meets XXXXian natives who give him a boomerang, with which he manages to hit himself in the head.

== Characters ==
- Rincewind
- Twoflower
- Mustrum Ridcully
- Cohen the Barbarian and the Silver Horde
  - Boy Willie, the only member of the horde under 80
  - Caleb the Ripper
  - Ronald Saveloy, or "Teach"
  - Truckle the Uncivil
  - Old Vincent
  - Mad Hamish
- Lord Hong, head of the Hong family, and the Emperor's Grand Vizier
- Red Army (both as an army of mostly children, and as an army of nameless golems)
- Four Big Sandal and Three Maximum Luck, slaves rescued by Rincewind and Cohen.
- Pretty Butterfly, Twoflower's older and wiser daughter
- Lotus Blossom, Twoflower's younger and more naive daughter
- Two Fire Herb, traitor & agent provocateur
- Three Yoked Oxen
- One Favourite Pearl, a young girl whose parents were killed by the feuding warlords
- The Luggage

== Themes ==
In an interview republished at L-space, the Terry Pratchett wiki, Pratchett explains the concepts behind the novel. "It'd be easier for people to read Interesting Times, than to sum it up, but I would say that one of the things I wanted to develop in the story was the strange way in which revolutions can turn into tyrannies. People struggle to over-throw tyrants, then suddenly find that they're ruled by "The Government" once again ― and popular uprisings don't stop often to ask common people what it is they need."

== Reception ==
Interesting Times was well received by critics.

The San Francisco Chronicle called the novel "unadulterated fun… Witty… Frequently hilarious" and remarked that "Pratchett parodies everything in sight."

A review at The A.V. Club, meanwhile, called it "a surprisingly thoughtful parable about oppressive government, East-West cultural relations, and revolutionary theory".

Reading order guide
Preceded by Soul Music	17th Discworld Novel	Succeeded by Maskerade
Preceded by ~~Faust~~ Eric	5th Rincewind Story; Published in 1994	Succeeded by The Last Continent
