= Discworld (world) =

Fictitious setting in the Discworld franchise

- The Discworld as it appears in the SkyOne adaptation of The Colour of Magic
- First appearance: The Colour of Magic (24 November 1983)
- Created by: Terry Pratchett

The Discworld is the fictional world where English writer Sir Terry Pratchett's Discworld fantasy novels take place. It consists of an interstellar planet-sized disc, which sits on the backs of four world elephants, themselves standing on the back of a world turtle, named Great A'Tuin, as it slowly swims through space.

The Disc is the setting for all forty-one Discworld novels; it was influenced by world religions which feature human worlds resting on turtles, as a setting to reflect situations on Earth, in a humorous way. The Discworld is peopled mostly by three main races: men, dwarfs, and trolls. As the novels progress, other lesser known races are included, such as dragons, elves, goblins, and pixies.

Pratchett first explored the idea of a disc-shaped world in the novel Strata (1981).

== Great A'Tuin ==
Great A'Tuin is the Giant Star Turtle (of the fictional species Chelys galactica) who travels through the Discworld universe's space, carrying four giant elephants (named Berilia, Tubul, Great T'Phon, and Jerakeen) who in turn carry the Discworld. Great A'Tuin frequently rolls on its belly to avoid asteroid and comet collisions, and even snatches projectiles out of the sky to protect the Disc. These stunts do not affect the Disc's population, other than to induce severe seasickness on anyone who happens to be looking at the night sky at that time.

Great A'Tuin's sex is unknown to the inhabitants of Discworld, but the subject of much speculation by the Disc's scientific minds. The sex of A'Tuin is pivotal in proving or disproving a number of conflicting theories about its destination. If, as the Discworld version of the popular "Big Bang theory" states, Great A'Tuin is moving from the Birthplace to the Time of Mating, then at the point of mating the civilisations of the Disc might be crushed, simply slide off, or else the entire world will end. The hypothesis is that all stars in the sky are also worlds carried by giant turtles, and that when all the turtles meet they will mate, birthing new turtles to carry new worlds.

The other theory, akin to the steady state theory, is the "steady gait" theory, which states that Great A'Tuin came from nowhere and will perpetually swim through space. Eric shows Great A'Tuin being made instantly from nothing, seemingly in support of the "steady gait" theory. In The Light Fantastic, the Great A'Tuin attends the hatching of eight baby turtles, each with four elephants and a discworld of their own, which appears to support the Big Bang hypothesis.

A small sun and moon orbit Great A'Tuin, both described as 1 mile (1.6 km) in diameter at the start of the series. The description of their diameter is increased to at least 80 miles (130 km) later in the chronicles. The moon is slightly closer to the Disc than the sun. One half is covered with silvery glowing plants, which feed lunar dragons. The other half is burnt black by the sun. The moon rotates and completes a full revolution in about a month; the full moon occurs when the luminescent side is completely visible from the Disc; the new moon when the dark side is shown. The sun's orbit is so complex that one of the elephants has to cock its leg to allow the sun to continue on its orbit.

According to the wizards of Unseen University, the bodies of Chelys galactica, and thus Great A'Tuin, are composed largely of the fictional element chelonium. The element's properties are known to the wizards, but not to readers.

== Magic ==
Magic is the principal force in Discworld and operates in a similar vein to real-world elemental forces such as gravity and electromagnetism. The Disc's "standing magical field" is essentially the local breakdown of reality, which allows a flat planet on the back of a turtle to exist. Magic is a function of the relative absence of reality in the local area, much in the same way that the absence of heat is described as coldness. Magic warps reality in much the same way as gravity warps space-time. The act of performing magic is, essentially, telling the universe what form it must take, in terms that the universe cannot ignore. This is draining to magic users, due to Discworld science's Law of Conservation of Reality, which states that magic and mundane methods require the same energy expenditure. This is why most wizards store magic in a staff, a capacitor for magical energy.

High-level background magic occurs when a powerful spell creates particles that distort reality. Entering a region where this has happened is extremely dangerous, as it is mentioned that an individual may not remain the same species, shape or level of sanity as they were when they entered. Medium levels cause odd effects, such as coins landing on their edges and objects transforming into caterpillars. Areas with large quantities of background magic tend to display unusual qualities, even for the Disc. High quantities of magic can knock a hole in Discworld reality, leading to an invasion by Lovecraftian monstrosities from the Dungeon Dimensions, or, almost as bad, the world of the Elves.

In the Discworld universe, magic is broken into elementary particulate fragments in much the same way that energy and other forces are in real-world quantum physics. The basic unit of magic is the thaum (from the Greek thauma, marvel), equal to the amount of mystical energy required to conjure a small white pigeon or three normal-sized billiard balls. Several SI-modifiers have been applied to it (e.g. millithaum, kilothaum). Magic can be measured with a thaumometer, a black cube with a dial on one side. A standard thaumometer can measure up to a million thaums; beyond that level, reality starts to break down. Parodying the introduction of the metric system, later novels refer to the introduction of the newer unit, the Prime, to avoid arguments over the standard sizing of pigeons. It is defined as the magical energy required to move a pound of lead one foot, referencing the joule.

The thaum also appears to be a particle, the equivalent of the atom. "Splitting the thaum" revealed that it was composed of numerous sub-particles, called resons ("thingies") which in turn are created from five "flavours": up, down, sideways, sex appeal, and peppermint (parodying quark flavours).

In the opening books, the number eight is significant and has magical properties on the Disc, (e.g. the number of the colour of Magic, octarine) and should never be spoken by wizards, especially in certain places. Doing so may allow the ancient dungeon dimension creature "Bel-Shamharoth the sender of eight" to break through (this is taken to an extreme end in one book, as even the narrator takes great pains to avoid saying the word). On the other hand, eight turns up in many places one would expect the number seven in the real world (e.g. the Discworld week contains eight days, not seven). After The Colour of Magic, both the colour and the number eight no longer appear as dangerous.

The Disc's magical field is centred on Cori Celesti. Everyday natural forces, such as light and magnetism, are muffled by the power of the Disc's magical field, and rather than a magnetised needle, navigators on the Disc use a compass with a needle of the magical metal octiron, which will always point towards Cori Celesti. Light is affected by magic, slowing it to moving hundreds of miles an hour rather than the speed of light.

=== The power of belief ===
Reality is spread thinly on the Disc, so events may be affected by expectations, especially those of 'intelligent' species. As such, the Discworld is not governed by real-world physics or logic but by belief and narrative resolution. Essentially, if something is believed strongly enough, or by enough people, it may become true. Jokes such as treacle mines and drop bears are real on the Disc. These concepts of Discworld physics are also exploited in magic. For example, if one wishes to turn a cat into a human, the easiest way is to convince the cat that it is human.

More significantly, it is also belief that gives Discworld's gods their powers. Discworld gods start off as small spirits, and gain power as they gain believers; this is explored most thoroughly in Small Gods. A similar effect has led to the personalisation and "reification" in the Discworld universe of mythological beings symbolising abstract concepts, such as Death. It is also possible for humans to gain godly powers through the power of belief, typically venerated rulers such as the Kings of Djelibeybi and Duchess Annagovia of Borogravia. It is possible for gods to derive power from misotheists, those who hate gods. As demonstrated in ~~Faust~~ Eric and Mort, personal belief determines someone's fate in the afterlife, rather than divine judgement, whether it is going to paradise or Hell, or being reincarnated.

Such is the nature of belief on the Disc that temporary new gods come into being on a regular basis, and often for such mundane things as stuck drawers; Anoia, Goddess of Things That Get Stuck in Drawers, came into her powers in such a manner, though she was previously a volcano goddess.

=== Narrative causality ===
The Disc's nature is fundamentally teleological; its basic composition is determined by what it is ultimately meant to be. This primary element, out of which all others spring, is known as narrativium, the elemental substance of Story. Nothing on the Disc can exist without a Story first existing to mould its destiny and determine its form. This is, perhaps, a take on the fact that nothing can ever happen on the Disc unless it is written in a story by Terry Pratchett. On the Disc, if a story or legend is told often enough and believed by enough people, it becomes true. This is known as the law of narrative causality.

Discworld witches often employ narrative in their magic, but consider it ethically tricky since it interferes with free will. Discworld wizards avoid doing so because narrative that severely strains credibility requires outright sources of magic to feed on, sometimes indiscriminately. Knowledge of stories, their use, and how to change them forms the basis of many forms of magical power in Discworld physics. Pratchett characters who use or change stories include Lilith, Black Aliss, and Granny Weatherwax. The habit of many Discworlders to take metaphor literally has combined with the power of belief to produce odd areas on Discworld.

=== Octarine ===
Octarine is the colour of magic on Discworld, also referred to as the eighth colour. Octarine is strongly indicative of magic and can only be seen by wizards and cats, who both possess "octagon cells" in addition to the normal cones and rods possessed by humans. This is an effect akin to tetrachromacy. Rincewind, a wizard, describes octarine as a fluorescent greenish-yellow purple.

=== Substances ===
The Disc contains magical substances. One such is octiron, a dense black metal that makes up much of Discworld's crust. Its melting point is above the range of metal forges. The gates of Unseen University are made out of it, as is Old Tom, the university's bell. It is used to make magic needles and bells. Octiron releases magical radiation, but if it becomes negatively polarised, it can be used to absorb the radiation. Octiron generates significant amounts of heat under pressure, accounting for most volcanic geological processes on Discworld. When struck, octiron briefly silences anything around it instead of producing sound.

Another is fingles, insinuated in Eric to be an important part of human psychology. Their absence, according to the Creator, can cause psychological problems. "On the surface they were all right, but deep down they knew something was missing", as he put it, referring to the inhabitants of a world where he forgot to include any. Since fingles do not exist on Earth, it is implied that Earth is the planet the Creator is referring to, and humanity is the species that is fundamentally incomplete because of their absence.

Slood is a natural substance that could be discovered by intelligent beings, but that humans on Earth have been too unintelligent to find; it is said to be much easier to discover than fire, and only slightly harder to discover than water. One of Rincewind's many accumulated positions is Reader in Slood Dynamics. The General Theory of Slood was discovered by Archchancellor Sloman, and a stained glass window representing this event is in the meeting room of the Unseen University college council. The University's plumbing system contains pipes for maintaining slood differential.

== The Disc ==
The Disc itself is roughly 10,000 miles (16,000 km) wide, giving it a surface area two-fifths that of Earth, which would make it roughly the size of the Pacific Ocean. In addition to its flatness, Pratchett gives it another principal geographic feature; Cori Celesti, a 10-mile-high (16 km) mountain that lies at its exact centre and is the point of origin for its standing magical field. Cori Celesti is also the location of Dunmanifestin, the home of many of the Disc's gods and the Discworld analogue of real-world Greek mythology's Mount Olympus. The area surrounding Cori Celesti is known as The Hub, a land of high, icebound mountains that serves as an analogue to the Himalayas, polar regions (since, although the Disc has no poles as such, it is as far as possible from the Disc's edge and thus the sun), and Scandinavia – the Hublanders share many features with Vikings. Polar bears are renamed "Hubland bears", while the Disc's equivalent of the aurora borealis (described as being produced by the Disc's magical field, rather than by magnetism) is known as the "Aurora Coriolis".

The areas closer to the Rim are warmer and tropical, since the Disc's sun passes closer to them in its orbit. At the Rim, a great, encircling waterfall (the Rimfall) sends the Disc's oceans cascading into space. Pratchett is evasive about how the water eventually returns to refill the oceans, only saying, "Arrangements are made." The mist from the plunging waters creates the Rimbow, an eight-colour (the eighth is octarine) double rainbow consisting of light and magic.

Cardinal directions within the Discworld are not given as North, South, East and West, but rather as directions relating to the disc itself: Hubward (towards the centre), Rimward (away from the centre) and to a lesser extent, turnwise (direction of the disc's rotation) and widdershins (against the direction of the disc's rotation). The drawing on the front cover of Jingo shows a weathercock fitted with the requisite H, R, T and W letters. The disc rotates clockwise as seen from above.

=== Circle Sea ===
The Circle Sea is a nearly landlocked body of water approximately halfway between the Hub and the Rim, opening at the turnwise side into the Rim Ocean. The Circle Sea is analogous to the Mediterranean Sea, in that it is bordered both by countries on the Sto Plains (Europe) and continent of Klatch (Middle East, North Africa). Its principal trading ports are Ankh-Morpork and Al Khali and Ephebe on the Rimwards side. The countries around the Circle Sea are Ankh-Morpork, Ephebe, Djelibeybi, Klatch, Omnia, and Tsort. The Circle Sea is the location of Leshp, an island that occasionally rises to the surface on a cushion of foul-smelling gas, before settling back to the seafloor once more. Leshp's last appearance nearly sparked a war between Ankh-Morpork and Klatch.

=== Unnamed Continent ===
The unnamed continent is the one on which most of the books are set. It is essentially the analogue of Europe, and contains among other things the Sto Plains and Ramtops, as well as the more Eastern European lands around Überwald.

==== Sto Plains ====
The Sto Plains are the rough analogue to Western Europe on the Discworld. They are a land of rich black loam, upon which rests a great squat forest of cabbages, the region's primary export. The cabbage has an almost mythic status among the people of the Sto Plains, and is an emblem of its largest and dominant city, Ankh-Morpork. Although they have been an empire in the past, the Sto Plains currently exist as a loose collection of independent city-states, ruled over by a close-knit ruling class.

==== Ankh-Morpork ====
The principal city of the Sto Plains is Ankh-Morpork. While it does not exert any political power over its neighbors, its economic domination of the region means that the smaller cities around it are essentially its satellites. Hippopotamuses are an important motif of the city, featuring on its coat of arms and in rows of statues along either side of its largest bridge, the Brass Bridge over the River Ankh. This is due to hippopotamuses living on the banks of the river on the site of the city in ancient times prior to the city's establishment.

==== Pseudopolis ====
Pseudopolis ("false city") is first mentioned in the first Discworld novel, The Colour of Magic. The novel also refers to Psephopololis, which according to The Discworld Mapp is the same place. The city is not to be confused with Pseudopolis Yard, the headquarters of the Ankh-Morpork City Watch (a reference to Scotland Yard). Pseudopolis possesses a school of magic, Braseneck College (a parody of Brasenose College, Oxford), which is apparently in competition for prestige with the larger, older Unseen University in Ankh-Morpork. This rivalry extends to the city level, as Pseudopolis refuses to accept an Ankh-Morpork-constructed trainline. While the city has been described as a duchy, the aristocracy of the city undertakes an experiment in representative democracy.

While no Discworld novels have been set in Pseudopolis, a number of characters have roots there. Eric Thursley lives/lived at 13 Midden Lane (Eric). Charlie, a man with an extraordinary physical resemblance to Ankh-Morpork Patrician Havelock Vetinari, ran a clothes shop there (The Truth). Nobby Nobbs had an early career as an armourer in one of the Pseudopolis city militias. John Keel, a city watchman, moved from Pseudopolis to Ankh-Morpork and was the mentor of the young Sam Vimes (Night Watch).

==== Quirm ====
Quirm is the location of the Quirm College for Young Ladies (formerly attended by Susan Sto Helit) and the birthplace of Leonard of Quirm (the Disc's equivalent of Leonardo da Vinci). It is a quiet and peaceful town, and for this reason is a popular holiday destination. It is also where Morporkians go when they retire (including Lord Vetinari's aunt, Lady Roberta Meserole). In this regard, it relates to Ankh-Morpork as Eastbourne relates to London, or possibly as Spain relates to the United Kingdom, or even Greece (as a description in Unseen Academicals describes Quirm as having "strange water", which is the typical stereotype of the Greek water supply).

The Quirmian language is occasionally described as similar to French or Spanish, but Snuff notes that all Quirmians speak perfect Morporkian. Spoken Quirmian in Making Money, is identical to French. In Raising Steam, the Marquis des Aix en Pains speaks Morporkian with a French accent.

Quirm is famous for its floral clock: a circle of flowers, each of which opens its petals at a different hour. Quirm is also famous for its (blue-veined) cheese. Quirmian cuisine is generally characterised by avec (French for "with").

Quirm is a duchy ruled by the Rodley family. Members of this family include Lord Rodley, an upper-class twit in Mort, and Brenda Rodley, a swamp dragon-breeding dowager duchess in Guards! Guards!. In Sourcery, Quirm was destroyed by wizards in a magic war, but presumably restored by Coin when he put everything back as it had been before the war.

Susan Sto Helit, Lady Sybil Ramkin and Miss Perspicacia Tick were educated at the Quirm College for Young Ladies. The school's headmistress and founder is Miss Eulalie Butts (possibly a reference to Frances Buss). It is explained in Soul Music that few of the Discworld's higher-class schools (such as the Ankh-Morpork Assassins' Guild School) will admit female students (although the Assassins have since changed this policy), so Miss Butts founded the College "on the astonishing principle that, since gels had nothing much to do until someone married them, they might as well occupy the time with learning things."

The school resembles a traditional English independent girls' school, with an academic curriculum and heavy emphasis on respectable and decent behaviour. Students at the school do not seem to be preparing for any particular profession. Susan Sto Helit describes it as "an education in, well, education" (Hogfather). It appears that those students who do not marry upon leaving school generally go into the teaching profession themselves, or become governesses.

==== Sto Lat ====
Sto Lat, ruled by Queen Kelirehenna, is located about 20 miles (32 km) from Ankh-Morpork.

Sto Lat is a sizable walled town in the Sto Plains, although eclipsed enormously both in size and influence by the neighbouring city of Ankh-Morpork. Sto Lat is the nearest major city to Ankh-Morpork (approximately a half day's journey by horse, less if the horse is Boris from Going Postal) and to which it is connected by two clacks towers. It encompasses a large boulder emerging out of the Sto Plains like 'a geological pimple', left there by the retreating Ice Giants. The castle is built into this rock.

Its most recent king before the present monarch was King Olerve, who was shot with a crossbow by an assassin hired by the original Duke of Sto Helit, a thoroughly nasty man who staged a bid for the succession, thwarted only by Mort in Mort. At the end of Mort, Princess Keli became Queen.

Politically, Sto Lat is the capital of a kingdom ruled by Queen Kelirehenna, which includes Sto Helit, Sto Kerrig, and the Eight Protectorates. Her authority is exercised through a Mayor, with parasol trader Joe Camels holding the position in Going Postal. The kingdom was one of the first places outside Ankh-Morpork to adopt its own stampings for the post.

Astolat is a legendary location in Arthurian mythology, and "Sto lat" is also a traditional Polish song equivalent to "Happy Birthday to You" ("sto lat" literally means "hundred years").

Sto Helit is a duchy within Sto Lat, which was given to Mort in Mort, after he saved Queen Kelirehenna and the previous Duke died (due to his lifetimer being destroyed during a duel between Mort and Death). Following his death in Soul Music, his daughter, Susan, succeeded him to become the Duchess of Sto Helit. Having pursued a career in education, serving as a governess in Hogfather and a teacher as of Thief of Time, her status as Duchess of Sto Helit has led to some awkwardness with her employers. Being the adoptive granddaughter of Death, she has "inherited" some of his supernatural abilities (such as imperception by other and passing through solid matter) and had once fulfilled his role in his absence.

==== Ramtops ====
The Ramtops are the Discworld's principal mountain range. Across their vast extent, from the Hub to the Rim, they incorporate elements from virtually every noted mountain range of Earth, from the Scottish Highlands (Lancre) to the Himalayas (the High Tops) to Appalachia (Slice). They are the Disc's main magical conduit, as they lie like a metal rod across the centre of the Disc's magical field, and are thus alive with unreality. Portals to various otherworlds dot the range's hidden crevices; "gnarly ground" compresses vast areas of land into tiny patches, and where witches, wizards, and godlike monks alike practice their arts.

Kingdoms in the Ramtops tend to be small, isolated, and sparsely populated. Much of the economy is agrarian and communities largely consist of loosely affiliated groups of self-sufficient farms. The Ramtops are known for their harsh winters; snow drifts can rise up to fifteen feet (4.6 m) during the worst storms. "Ramtoppers have 18 words for snow," Pratchett says, "none of them printable."

Pratchett mentioned that the name of the Ramtops comes from RAMTOP (i.e. top of RAM, or random-access memory), a system variable in the ZX Spectrum computer.

==== Lancre ====
Lancre is situated in the Ramtop mountains, about 500 miles (800 km) Hubwards of the city of Ankh-Morpork. It is the best-known of hundreds of tiny countries in the Ramtops, occupying a vertiginous shelf looking over the Sto Plains.

Lancre is based on rural southern England. In an article in Folklore entitled, 'Imaginary Worlds, Real Stories,' Pratchett writes, "the kingdom of Lancre [...] I suspect is a somewhat idealised version of the little fold in the Chiltern Hills where I grew up, stirred in with the western area of the Mendips where I spent a great deal of my adult life." Pratchett described the tiny country as "solid folklore"; it is the place all the legends of Earth's countryside really happened. Ankh-Morpork serves a similar function for urban folklore, but not as blatantly. The name seems to echo Lancashire (with the inhabitants called Lancrastians) and the associated witch trials in Pendle there in the seventeenth century.

Part of the reason for Lancre's mystical quality is that the Ramtops are a major earthing point for the Discworld's magical field. Lancre is famous for witches, especially since the publication of The Joye of Snackes, an erotic cookbook by "A Lancre Witch", i.e. Nanny Ogg. Lancre is also famous for its young people going off and seeking their fortunes, usually in Ankh-Morpork. Lancre is also the physical location for (possibly two) independent gateways to a "parasite universe" inhabited by Elves.

Most maps show Lancre as roughly 40 by 10 miles (64 by 16 km), its true area remains unknown – partly because of its mountainous terrain and the fact that it borders on the Ramtops, but also due to the warping effect of background magic. Geography in parts of Lancre can take on additional properties that exist either outside, or in addition to, the conventional geographic dimensions. These areas include the Lancre moors, where reality can become folded into deep troughs and ridges known as "gnarly ground". The effect, as mentioned in The Discworld Companion is that Lancre contains more landscape than a kingdom of its apparent size should contain.

In times past, Elven incursions were common. Both gateways have been sealed from the Lancre side by standing stones made from thunderbolt iron, a meteoric ore which is one of the few sources of magnetism on the Disc; humans, but not Elves (except in exceptional circumstances), may pass through them.

The capital of Lancre is Lancre Town, slightly bigger than the other villages, and containing Lancre Castle. Bad Ass is the home of Granny Weatherwax. It got its name when a donkey, carrying the supplies of a group of settlers, stopped on a ford and refused to move, forcing them to build their town there. The valley occupied by Bad Ass overlooks a panorama of lesser mountains and foothills. From there, one can see to the edge of the world. In the long winter snows, the roads out of the village are lined with boards to reduce drifting and to stop travellers from straying. A narrow bridge over a stream leads to the village smithy, birthplace of Eskarina Smith.

==== Hublands ====
The lands around the Hub, also called the High Tops, are icy, mountainous and cold. They are also the areas closest to the Cori Celesti, and so are crackling with magic. They are roughly equivalent to Earth's Himalayas, being home to Yeti and various Buddhist-style monastic orders, such as the History Monks, which give the area the nickname "Enlightenment Country". The Hublands are also the closest thing the Disc has to a pole, and so are home to its equivalent of polar bears and walruses, mentioned in The Last Hero.

==== Überwald ====
Überwald (German pronunciation: [ˈyːbɐvalt]) is a region located near the foot of the Ramtops, farther from Ankh-Morpork than Lancre is.

Its name is German for "over the woods", a play on Transylvania (which is Latin for "across the woods" - a name actually used for Transylvania in some 13th century writings). The region is based less on the real Eastern Europe, and more on the Hammer Horror stereotype of the area. In keeping with the Discworld's affinity for narrative, Überwald's climate and conditions contrive to fulfill human expectations: for example, Überwaldian thunderclaps occur whenever someone makes a particularly forceful pronouncement. In The Truth this phenomenon is referred to as "psychotropic weather".

The spelling of the German-language word is certainly "Überwald". The usage in some of the books is uneven, but the later narratives use "Uberwald" exclusively. In Carpe Jugulum, Pratchett writes:

On the rare maps of the Ramtops that existed, it was spelled Überwald. But Lancre people had never got the hang of accents and certainly didn't agree with trying to balance two dots on another letter, where they'd only roll off and cause unnecessary punctuation.

The region was previously united under the rule of the Unholy Empire (a play on the Holy Roman Empire), which had a two-headed bat as its symbol (a play on the double headed eagle). The Empire has long since collapsed leaving the area fragmented, chaotic, and under the rule of lore, not law.

Although Überwald has a large human population, they play a secondary role in the region's history. It is ruled by dwarfs, vampires, and werewolves. Sergeant (later Captain) Angua of the Ankh-Morpork City Watch is from an old aristocratic family of Überwald werewolves. While there are indeed a number of human barons, they all tend to be uninterested in politics, preferring instead to dabble in experimental surgery and "Meddling In Things Man Was Not Meant To Wot Of," each with the help of their personal Igors.

From the 'Diet of Bugs' (a play on the Diet of Worms) onwards garlic and silver were considered contraband across Überwald until the events of The Fifth Elephant; the undead simply promised they would not be needed. Apparently this system left something to be desired. Following interference by werewolves in the coronation of the Low King of the Dwarfs, dwarfish restrictions on silver mining were lifted.

Überwald's economy is apparently based on mining. Though precious metals are plentiful, the most crucial mineral resource is fat, which is believed to have been deposited by a fifth great Discworld-bearing elephant, which was dislodged from the back of Great A'Tuin and crashed into the ground around Überwald. Boiling fat rising to the surface is the reason for the country's many hot springs.

Überwald effectively comprises two utterly distinct societies; the dwarfs (who exist below in their cavernous cities and tunnels), and everybody else, who lives above on the surface. By tradition, the laws of the surface people do not apply underground, and vice versa. Überwaldian dwarfs are far more hidebound and traditional than their cousins near the Sto Plains, which has led to a certain culture clash between the two (cf. marching season). Überwald is the centre of Dwarfish history and politics; the Low King, the final arbiter of Dwarfish law, has his seat of power in the underground Überwald city of Schmaltzberg (literally "mountain of fat"; a double or even triple play on the Austrian town of Salzburg: Schmaltz means lard or fat in German, but can also mean 'excessive sentimentality').

Koom Valley is a location somewhere in Überwald. Hundreds of years ago, the trolls and the dwarfs met in a battle at Koom Valley in which each side apparently ambushed the other. Nowadays, dwarfs celebrate the Battle of Koom Valley Day, on the same day that trolls celebrate Troll New Year. Sometimes, in a city where both dwarfs and trolls live (e.g. Ankh-Morpork), the two groups are careful enough to plan their celebratory marches so that they are on the same street. Some people (e.g. Susan Sto Helit), after carefully studying history books, point out that the Battle of Koom Valley seemed to have been repeated several times. The name comes from the Welsh word cwm, which means "valley".

In Unseen Academicals, it is suggested that Uberwald is developing and moving closer to Ankh-Morpork thanks to the vampire Lady Margalotta. It also suggests that the Emperor of Uberwald was an evil sorcerer, who created orcs, some of whom survived up to the present, giving rise to Mr. Nutt.

==== Borogravia ====
Borogravia is located Rimwards of Überwald, on the Discworld's unnamed main continent. The capital city is PrinceMarmadukePiotreAlbertHansJosephBernhardtWilhelmsberg. Borogravia is a Duchy, ruled by a Duke or Duchess. The ruler at the time of Monstrous Regiment was Duchess Annagovia, who has achieved virtual godhood among the people.

Borogravia is an extremely backward and reactionary nation, whose laws are defined by their god Nuggan. Nuggan dictates "abominations", which are things that have been banned by him, to his worshippers via the Book of Nuggan, a "living testament" in which new "abominations" appear "religiously" from Nuggan, with the necessity of adding fresh pages making it the only holy book to be kept in a ring binder. These enforcements can be very impractical and inconvenient, such as banning chocolate, Borogravia's main export; depictions of living things (apart from the Duchess); babies (this law is usually overlooked); crop rotation; and any means of airborne communications (namely semaphore and carrier pigeon). The banning of semaphore led to the Borogravians cutting down the clacks towers along the Zlobenian border, which was one of the main causes of war between the two nations (with intermittent conflict going on for so long that no-one can remember why it is actually happening), and the reason for Ankh-Morporkian diplomatic intervention. Perhaps the most militarily aggressive nation on the Disc, Borogravia is known for invading its neighbours and fighting wars (in Night Watch, it is mentioned in passing that Borogravia has invaded Mouldavia), with the army being regarded as the only effective branch of government. However, it struggles to keep up with this demand because of its crippled economy (caused by highly inconvenient "abominations"), and as a result of fighting the country is seriously short of young men, so much that a proportion of its soldiers are in fact women in disguise (see Monstrous Regiment). At the beginning of the novel, aspects of modern society such as police services and newspapers are alien concepts to Borogravians, with Nugganatic laws being enforced by 'citizen's committees', and the government being the sole disseminator of information to the public.

The Borogravian national currency is the crown, whose subunits include shillings, sixpences and pennies.

==== Zlobenia ====
Zlobenia, a pun on Slovenia, with its capital Rigour, a pun on Riga, is a principality ruled by Prince Heinrich, who is described as tall, handsome, and smug. It has fought numerous wars with Borogravia, usually territorial disputes over the River Kneck, which forms the border between the two nations and frequently changes course after flooding. Worship of Nuggan was banned in Zlobenia without much objection. Zlobenia's soldiers wear blue uniforms. Borogravians call Zlobenians 'swede eaters'. Heinrich has visions of making Zlobenia "the Ankh-Morpork of the mountains", much to the amusement of Samuel Vimes. Heinrich is also heir to the Borogravian throne after the death of the Duchess Annagovia. In Monstrous Regiment he declares war against Borogravia to assert his claim.

==== Chalk ====
The Chalk is an area of rolling chalk downland near Lancre, bearing a great resemblance to Pratchett's native Wiltshire. The "soft" geology of the area is, according to some mountain witches, not conducive to the channelling of magic. In fact this is a misconception (the bones of the hills are flint), and powerful witches reside there, although the local baron has outlawed witchcraft, meaning they do not identify themselves as such. This law has since been repealed or at least ignored by the new baron since Tiffany Aching began openly practising magic there.

==== Llamedos ====
Llamedos is a land noted for its druids, bards, and rain. Rain is the chief export of Llamedos; it has rain mines, in addition to ore and coal mines. Holly is the one plant that can grow in Llamedos's climate; everything else just rots. Llamedos is run by druids, who dot the land with stone circles used for computation. This is a lifetime job, since they frequently need upgrading. Llamedos is a parody of the British constituent country Wales. Its annual bardic competition, the Eisteddfod, is still held in Wales. The name is a reference to Dylan Thomas's radio play "Under Milk Wood", for which he created the fictitious Welsh town of Llareggub ("bugger all" spelled backwards); Llamedos, accordingly, is "Sod 'em all" spelled backwards. The inhabitants tend to speak with a doubled-L accent, i.e. "Llots of lluck!" Its native son Imp Y Celyn changes the course of the Discworld's musical history in Soul Music.

==== Octarine Grass Country ====
The Octarine Grass Country is an area of rich farmland which, thanks to its proximity to the Ramtops, also happens to be saturated with magic. So saturated, in fact, that it is possible to grow re-annual crops: crops that germinate and grow the spring before they are planted. This is the homeland of Mort. The Octarine Grass Country predominantly features in Reaper Man, where Death goes to work under the name Bill Door.

==== Genua ====
The most notable region beyond the Sto Plains is the small city of Genua, a Morporkian-speaking nation that bears some resemblance to New Orleans. Its most significant appearance in the books is in Witches Abroad. It is in an area called the Swamplands, some distance from the Sto Plains/Ramtops locations of most of the books.

The name Genua is probably based on Genoa, a city in Italy. However, Genua bears a striking resemblance to the French and Caribbean-influenced American South, especially New Orleans. Local transport is by cattle- or troll-powered paddleboats with onboard gambling. The local witch, Erzulie Gogol, is a Voodoo mambo and the local food is essentially Cajun cuisine, including gumbo.

During the events of Witches Abroad the city was ruled by an evil fairy godmother, Lily Weatherwax, (sister of Lancre witch Esme Weatherwax) though she went by the name Lilith de Tempscire (a French calque of "weather"+"wax"). She was obsessed with fairy tales and thought she could force everyone to be happy if only she could get them to follow the logic of the "happy ending." Under her rule, innkeepers who were not fat and jolly or inclined to tell jokes were sent to the dungeon, and Genua's ruler, the Baron Saturday, was murdered so that his heir apparent, Ella, could be a neglected orphan, as the tales dictated. Soon, the city began to resemble a skewed version of Disneyland. The name "Genua" therefore could also be an ironic echo of "genuine", which is exactly what Genua, at this time, was not. Due to the efforts of the Lancre Coven, Lily was deposed and sent to a dimension of endless mirrors, and Ella was able to assume her role as Baroness of Genua without marrying a frog as Lily had intended.

Genua first gained power under Tacticus, a former general of the Morporkian Empire who was invited to become King of Genua after the previous royal family died out due to interbreeding (with the last king having attempted to continue his line with himself). After evaluating which nation posed the greatest threat to his new kingdom, Tacticus proceeded to declare war on Ankh-Morpork. Tacticus' influence on Genua may explain its use of Morporkian as its main language and greater cultural similarities with Ankh-Morpork and the Sto Plains instead of with Überwald and Muntab.

According to the novel Going Postal, Genua is located approximately 2,000 miles (3,200 km) from Ankh-Morpork by road, a journey of two months by stagecoach. A faster method is to travel by flying broomstick, whereby the city can be reached in a single day, though this may prove fatal.

=== Klatch ===
The continent of Klatch consists of part of Discworld that is rimwards of the Circle Sea. Like the distinction between Europe and Asia, the difference between Klatch and the unnamed continent that Ankh-Morpork stands upon is arbitrary and cultural rather than geographically evident. The continent includes the Circle Sea states of Ephebe, Tsort, Djelibeybi, Omnia, and the more rimwards territories of Howondaland, Tezumen Empire, Betrek, Smale, Klatchistan, and Muntab. It can be thought of as roughly equivalent to Africa, though Pratchett denied this.

The continent's principal nation, also called Klatch, is a large multi-ethnic empire rimwards to turnwise of the Circle Sea. It resembles medieval Arabic states, and has a political system similar to the Ottoman Empire. Its capital is Al Khali, and it includes outlying regions such as Hersheba and Syrrit. Klatch is a commercial rival of Ankh-Morpork – the book Jingo depicts a brief war between the two mainly on economic land ownership grounds. It is also a common metaphorical boundary for anything considered genuinely "foreign", despite other areas of similar distance not being considered as such. There is some cultural mistrust between the Sto Plains and Klatch, as evidenced by the phrase "Pardon my Klatchian" upon speaking a rude word.

Despite the tendency of Morporkians to see Klatchians as savages, Jingo makes clear that Klatchians are technologically and scientifically advanced. This situation parallels that which existed between Europe and the Arab world throughout the Middle Ages. The ruler of Klatch is called the Seriph (perhaps a play on caliph, sherif/sharif, seraph and serif). In Sourcery, the Seriph was Creosote, a rather vain and foolish man who was obsessed with poetry. A genie reportedly granted a great fortune to his grandfather, which was more or less squandered by modern times. It is unknown whether Creosote is still Seriph; the Prince Cadram and Prince Khufurah appeared in Jingo, but it is unknown whether they are relatives of Creosote. The "Klatchian Foreign Legion" parodies French military activities in North Africa. The name is probably a play on "coffee klatsch"; a recognition of its most famous export, Klatchian coffee. The principal deity of Klatch is Offler, a crocodile-headed god.

Al Khali has been described by Rincewind as "like Ankh, only with sand instead of mud". It is bisected by the Tsort River. The city is noted for its wind, which blows from the vast deserts of Klatch, and has been described as "a gentle but persistent breeze". Notable features of the city include

- The Rhoxie: The Seriph of al Khali's resplendent palace, in the centre of the city. Surrounded by an artificial paradise, it contains the Seriph's harem and courtiers. However, it was heavily damaged during the events of Sourcery, and it is unknown whether it was repaired. However it was mentioned in Pyramids as being "down the coast".
- The soak (a play on souk): A bazaar highly spoken of by Cohen the Barbarian. A series of alleys, frequented by the criminal underclass.
- The Temple Frescoes: Famous frescoes of people involved in sexual acts. Tours leave hourly from the Square of 967 Delights (Khalians are meticulous about things that interest them).

Klatchian coffee is a strong, nearly magical coffee with a strong sobering effect, bringing the drinker "to the other side of sobriety". This state of sobriety is referred to as knurd ("drunk" spelled backwards). To be knurdish is described as the opposite of being drunk: Not sobriety – the mere absence of drunkenness – but just as far away from sobriety in the opposite direction, resulting in an appalling existential clarity. According to Sourcery, being knurd strips away all the comforting illusions in which people usually spend their lives, letting them see and think clearly for the first time. This is a very traumatic experience, although it is noted that it sometimes leads to important discoveries. To counteract the effects of Klatchian coffee, in Klatch it is drunk with Orakh (an alcoholic beverage made by mixing scorpion venom and cactus sap and fermenting it in the sun for several weeks).

Although knurdness is a state usually only obtainable by drinking Klatchian coffee, Samuel Vimes, one of the Discworld's most notable characters, is described in Guards! Guards! as being naturally two drinks short of actual sobriety. This makes him slightly knurd by default, which partially accounts for his depressive nature and tendency towards alcoholism—he started out looking for a cure to knurdness. Once he starts drinking, however, he cannot stop and always gets the dosage wrong.

==== Ephebe ====
Ephebe is largely the Discworld analogue of Athenian Greece. However, it also takes influences from Alexandria and Minos; the name is an Anglicisation of the Greek concept of ephebos. Ephebe lies on the hubwards shores of the Circle Sea on the Klatchian continent, widdershins of the Klatchian Empire, Tsort and Djelibeybi and turnwise of Omnia.

Ephebe has only been visited twice in the novels, in Pyramids and Small Gods. However, we know from Eric that in its early history, it fought a series of damaging wars against Tsort, with which it remains in a cold-war situation to this day. The disappearance of the Djel River valley in Pyramids briefly sparked a resumption of hostilities, which mostly involved highly reluctant soldiers hiding in wooden horses, waiting for the other side to take them into the city. This was quickly ended by the Djel's abrupt reappearance. In Small Gods, it was briefly invaded by Omnia; however, this occupation quickly collapsed and Ephebe launched a decisive counter-strike in alliance with the other nations along the Klatchian coast.

The country was heavily affected by the first temporal shattering mentioned in Thief of Time, as a result of which the philosophers living there appear extraordinarily long-lived. Ephebe has a population of about 50,000, according to The Discworld Companion. Much of this population is made up of slaves, who have steadfastly refused any efforts to give them more rights; they are quite happy with their guaranteed income and safety as slaves and the possibility of owning slaves of their own.

As a democracy, Ephebe is unusual on Discworld. Those citizens who are not disqualified on account of being foreigners, mad, poor or female elect a Tyrant to run the city, who invariably turns out to be a criminal madman. They then elect another Tyrant, who is much the same. At the time of Small Gods, Ephebe was ruled by an unnamed man with a large, egg-shaped body. It is unknown whether he is still ruler.

According to The Discworld Companion, it does not have an economy. The people are perfectly happy living off the fish and olives farmed by the slaves, or the way Teppic described it in Pyramids, they made wine of everything they could stuff in a bucket and ate whatever could not crawl out of one, which gives time for Ephebe's major export: philosophy. The currency of Ephebe is the talent. Ephebe is a city of philosophers; some hardware merchants have taken to stocking towels, in case of clothing-challenged brilliant thinkers (an allusion to Archimedes' "Eureka!"). The philosophers are noted for pondering the existence of gods, but carefully in case the gods get angry. Brawls between varying philosophical factions frequently erupt across Ephebe's many taverns, but Ephebe is on the whole a peaceful city, which ambles by from day to day (The New Discworld Companion). One of the philosophers Teppic met in Ephebe was instrumental in the building of a lighthouse. The proposed location for the lighthouse was deemed to be disruptive to the view of the harbour and so it was placed some distance inland. Sailors who find themselves stranded on the rocks of the harbour have considered the lighthouse a quite beautiful thing to look at whilst waiting to be rescued.

==== Djelibeybi ====
Djelibeybi is based on the cultures of Ancient Egypt. Also called the Kingdom of the Sun and the Old Kingdom. Its principal crops are melons, garlic, and pyramids. The name "Djelibeybi" is a pun lost on most people outside the UK, South Africa, Australia and New Zealand, playing on "Jelly baby", a popular gummi sweet in those countries. The joke is compounded when Pratchett says that "Djelibeybi" means "Child of the Djel" (its main river; the line is a parody of Herodotus's famous claim that Egypt was the "gift of the Nile"). Djelibeybi is two miles (3.2 km) wide and 150 miles (240 km) long and is on the Circle Sea coast of Klatch. The ancient country of Ur lies Rimward of it. The kingdom is almost entirely underwater during the flood season, and both threatened and protected on either side by stronger neighbours (Tsort and Ephebe). It was once great, but all that now remains is an expensive palace, a few ruins and pyramids. The entire economic life of the country is, until after the events of Pyramids, devoted to building them. As a result, Djelibeybi is permanently bankrupt. The country has an enormous number of local gods, unknown to the world outside. Its ruler, the Pharaoh, is also a god, although in human form. He wears a gold mask called the Face of the Sun. Pharaoh Pteppicymon XXVIII, also known as Pteppic, discovered that the mask was in fact gilded lead, the original gold one having likely been sold to pay for the pyramids. Following the events of Pyramids, Djelibeybi has been ruled by Ptraci I, the half-sister of Pteppicymon XXVIII and a former handmaiden.

==== Tsort ====
Tsort is an analogue of ancient Troy. Its enmity with Ephebe began with the famous Tsortean War, when King Mausoleum of Tsort kidnapped Queen Eleneor of Ephebe, leading to a siege that lasted for decades. To this day Tsort and Ephebe believe there is a place for giant wooden horses in combat. Tsort possesses a Great Pyramid, although pyramid-building has long been out of fashion and – no doubt because of the example of nearby Djelibeybi – modern Tsorteans scorn the things. Tradition claims Tsort was razed by the armies of Ephebe under Lavaeolus, and that it was home to the famed Tsortean Knot until the Knot was undone – sliced in half – by Carelinus. The people of Tsort worship all manner of gods, some of which seem to comprise all the bits the other gods had left over. The river Tsort bisects the desert rimwards of Al Khali.

==== Omnia ====
Omnia is a desert theocracy ruled by the Cenobiarch, the head of the Omnian Church, from the Citadel in the capital city of Kom (a sort of cross between Qum, Jerusalem and the Vatican). There is also a connection to the Latin word 'Omnis', meaning all or everything, ironic due to the nation's unipolar outlook. When Omnianism was an intolerant religion it was known for its imperialism, having conquered the neighbouring countries of Betrek, Istanzia and Ushistan in the name of the Great God Om. After Brutha became the Cenobiarch, the country reversed directions and became the home of a renowned theological college and library. These days it is known for the constant arguing amongst the clergy, as new interpretations of Brutha's teachings spring up every day. The currency of Omnia is the obol. In The Truth, it was mentioned that Omnia (or possibly the Agatean Empire) developed movable type printing in the production of religious texts.

==== Deepest Klatch ====
Howondaland is the Discworld's principal "jungle" region. It lies on the Klatchian continent, and is an analogue to Sub-Saharan Africa, although the Tezumen Empire gives it Mesoamerican overtones as well. Howondaland is not so much a country as a blank patch on the map. Just as "darkest Africa" remained largely unexplored by Europeans until the 19th century, "darkest Klatch" is largely unknown to most Discworlders. Exploration of the land has been hampered by the habit of explorers ending up nailed to trees. In Snuff, it was discovered that inexpensive tobacco for consumption in Ankh-Morpork was produced on Howondaland plantations, using slave labour by goblins transported from the Shires.

The Great Nef is a vast desert on the Klatchian continent, noted mainly for containing the Dehydrated Ocean, an ocean consisting of dehydrated water. Dehydrated water is a peculiar substance found only in areas of high magical concentration. It resembles fine sand, but can be reconstituted into normal water by adding water. The Dehydrated Ocean is home to its own, unique, kinds of fish. The name "Nef" is a reversal of fen, a type of wetland; "Great Nef" in particular may be a reference to the Great Fen, an historical wetland area in England in the area now known as The Fens and the subject of a restoration effort known as the Great Fen Project.

Only briefly mentioned in the books, Hersheba is a small desert kingdom rimwards of Klatchian empire, practically on the boundary of Howondaland. The country is said to be ruled by a queen who lives forever (probably a reference to H. Rider Haggard's She). The nomadic tribes known as the D'regs occupy areas of Hersheba as well as Klatch. Depredations against Klatch by Hersheban D'regs, against Hersheba by Klatchian D'regs, and against both sides by their own D'regs has led to the border being in a permanent state of war. The name is a play on Hershey bar and also resembles Israeli Beersheba; Pratchett initially suggested it as an alternative name for Djelibeybi, to aid American readers mystified by the pun.

Very little is known about the Theocracy of Muntab. Its ruler is known as a Pash (Lu-Tze, the History Monk, once had to make sure one of them choked on a fishbone). It is often used as a generic third-world country, as in "Eat your dinner, there are starving children in Muntab who'd be glad to have that!" It is more or less on the border between the continent of Klatch and the Unnamed Continent, and is located more or less rimwards of Borogravia. Muntab is known to be eager to emerge as a dominant nation in the modern world, and is suspected to have ambitions to conquer the hubward nations, most notably Borogravia. As a result, it figures into the famous political problem, the Muntab Question – most often quoted as "Where's Muntab?", but in serious political discussion is more likely to concern the sides on which the more developed nations would fall in a war between Muntab and Borogravia. Muntab is very likely one of the nations in the Alliance that Borogravia is fighting in the novel Monstrous Regiment.

Nothing is known of Istanzia, although it is a state big enough to send an Ambassador to Ankh-Morpork for Commander Vimes to frighten: when in The Fifth Elephant the Istanzian forces were reported to be making repeated armed incursions across the Slipnir River, Vimes's offer to arrange for the Istanzian Ambassador to "...go home in an ambulance" resulted in the Istanzian forces pulling back so far that they were "...nearly in the next country." At some point, Istanzia was controlled by Omnia (Small Gods), but it can be assumed they have gained personal jurisdiction.

The Tezumen Empire is a jungle civilisation in the darkest depths of Howondaland that resembles the Aztecs. They are renowned as the most pessimistic and angst-ridden culture on the Disc; their writing is engraved on giant slabs of stone rather than more conveniently written on paper. Large discs of precisely-carved stone with holes in the middle are used for almost every imaginable purpose except making wheels, a technology which they have not yet discovered. Before the events in Eric, they worshiped the "feathered boa" Quezovercoatl, a parody of the Mesoamerican deity Quetzalcoatl, who was a junior demon who supplanted the previous Tezumen god, a stick; after manifesting himself to his worshippers, he was revealed to be only six inches high. The Tezumens since tired of gods and killed all their priests.

=== Counterweight Continent ===
The Counterweight Continent is situated on the opposite edge of the Discworld from the Unnamed Continent and Klatch. It is smaller than these other two landmasses but acts as a counterweight because its crust is made up largely of gold and octiron, both dense, heavy metals. It is (roughly) comma-esque in shape, and the tip of the comma extends all the way up to the ice cap at the Hub. Its closest point to the Unnamed Continent is about 15 miles (24 km) away but, as the channel is under an ice cap, it is often referred to as an isthmus. The cultures of the Counterweight Continent are a play upon those of Earth's Far East, or at least Western perceptions of it. In a pun on the Orient, it is also known as the Aurient, from the Latatian (Latin) word 'aurum' (gold), meaning 'the place where gold comes from'.

The Agatean Empire is the home of Twoflower and the Luggage. The country was mentioned in the first Discworld novel The Colour of Magic, but was not explored: its main role was as the place from which Twoflower had come. It appeared in a brief segment of Mort, and was the setting for most of Interesting Times.

The Agatean Empire is similar to feudal Japan or Imperial China, most obviously in the vast wall that surrounds it, and the belief that anyone from outside the Empire must be an invisible vampire ghost (probably a play on gwailo, lit. ghost man). The name is a pun on the term "Jade Empire," referring to ancient China. The capital of the Empire is Hunghung and the biggest port (and only one mentioned) is Bes Pelargic. However, in Mort, Bes Pelargic was depicted as the Agatean capital, as Mort travelled there for the death of the Grand Vizier Nine Turning Mirrors.

The crust of the Agatean Empire is composed largely of gold, octiron and other heavy metals. Exchange rates between the Ankh-Morpork dollar and the Empire's currency, the rhinu, has never been established because the solid gold coins are worth significantly less on the Counterweight Continent than on the Sto Plains. Because of the readily-availability of gold, the Counterweight Continent is comparable to the Roundworld's African Mali Empire. Gold is such a ubiquitous metal in the Agatean Empire that it has taken on the role of lead as a material for roofing and plumbing; gold is only used for small denominations of the rhinu, whilst larger denominations such as ten rhinu are issued in the form of paper notes.

Large amounts of octiron make Agatean Empire home of the rare sapient pear trees. The wood of this tree is used to build luggages.

The Empire was founded thousands of years ago by the Emperor One Sun Mirror. Until fairly recently, it was ruled by a number of constantly fighting and somewhat psychotic noble families (the Hongs, the Sungs, the Fangs, the Tangs and the McSweeneys), all jockeying to be emperor. They viewed politics as similar to chess; the goal was to put one's opponent in an untenable position, and the best way to do that was to take as many opposing pieces as possible through the sacrifice of pawns.

As in feudal Japan (and later the Empire of Japan), the Emperor was seen as a god, and could do anything he liked. Given how nastily inventive a noble had to be to get to this point, this was not a good thing. In The Colour of Magic and Mort, the Emperor was an idealistic young boy; however, by Interesting Times, he had been supplanted by an elderly man who was quite insane (and who is said to have killed his nephew for the throne). During Interesting Times, Cohen the Barbarian was declared Emperor, and started changing the system into one a no-nonsense barbarian could feel comfortable with. It was felt by many of the peasantry that he was the "preincarnation" of One Sun Mirror, because Agateans believe in a form of backward reincarnation in which the soul's next life takes place chronologically earlier than its previous life. Since the events of The Last Hero, it can be presumed Cohen is no longer Emperor. Details of his replacement are unknown, although it is implied that most of the duties of governance had already been assumed by his Grand Vizier Twoflower by the time of his intended-to-be death. In the companion book The Compleat Discworld Atlas, the Empire has been supplanted by the People's Beneficent Republic of Agatea, led by the Chairman of the Central Committee of the People's Revolution Madame Butterfly (possibly Twoflower's daughter and the former leader of the revolutionary Red Army).

Bhangbhangduc is a subject island of the Agatean Empire.

The island fulfills the role of Borneo, in that it is large, covered in jungle, and home to the orangutan. It is also the site of the death of explorer Sir Roderick Purdeigh, after he yelled at a "native" and jabbed him with his walking stick in an attempt to make him stand up straight and say something other than "ook". Bhangbhangduc's unusual flora includes the carnivorous sledgehammer plant.

It appears unusual in the economics of the disc in that Bhangbhangduc uses the Silver Standard to base its money. This is unpopular in other areas who use gold (which does not tarnish).

Bhangbhangduc has its own distinct ethnic cuisine, encountered via Feeney Upshot's grandparents in Snuff. Examples include:

- Bang Suck Duck (swede and chips optional)
- Man Dog Suck Po (with mashed carrots, but only as a Sunday special)

=== Fourecks ===
EcksEcksEcksEcks or Fourecks (previously known as XXXX or Terror Incognita) is clearly influenced by Australian culture, as seen in The Last Continent. Like Australia, Fourecks is both a country and a continent. It consists largely of desert land, which for some time remained unfinished. It was created some time after the rest of the Discworld by the old man who carries the universe in a sack. Lu-Tze and other sources state that on Fourecks time and space are very twisted up, and there is a big time source right in the middle (probably the Red Rock, the Ecksian version of Uluru). The continent's name is a play on Castlemaine XXXX, a Queensland lager, and advertised there with adverts playing on Australian stereotypes. According to the books, maps used the label "XXXX" because no-one knew what the place was called.

Both the flora and fauna of the continent are extremely dangerous, as Death's Library attests. A book series known as Dangerous Mammals, Reptiles, Amphibians, Birds, Fish, Jellyfish, Insects, Spiders, Crustaceans, Grasses, Trees, Mosses and Lichens of Terror Incognita extends at least into Volume 29c Part Three, while a list of the harmless ones contains only "Some of the sheep." There are few poisonous snakes in XXXX, the explanation being that "most of them have been eaten by the spiders".

For much of its history, the entire continent was surrounded with an anticyclone which prevented rainclouds from arriving or ships from leaving. This was due to interference by the wizards of Unseen University while fleeing the bug-obsessed god of evolution during the creation of Fourecks. Shortly before the permanent drought reached catastrophic proportions, the anticyclone was dissipated by Rincewind.

The indigenous population are very similar to Indigenous Australians, with a strong mythology. Until recently, their main peculiarity was a tendency to attack anyone who talked about the weather. There is also a population of Ankh-Morporkian settlers, from various shipwrecks.

The capital of Fourecks is evidently Bugarup. Other known settlements are Dijabringabeeralong, Cangoolie (a parody of Kalgoorlie) and Worralorrasurfa. Time and space appear more consistent in these areas. An odd quirk of the Fourecksian government is that they immediately put their politicians in jail as soon as they are elected. According to the locals, "It saves time." Another important feature of the city is the Old Brewery, where Roo Beer lager is made. It has a huge billboard featuring a grinning kangaroo. The New Brewery is abandoned, because it was built on an "unsacred site" which made the beer flat- a reference to the Old Swan Brewery of Perth, Western Australia. There is also a local magic college for wizards. The university's motto is Nullus Anxietas (no worries). The university is similar in some ways to Unseen University in Ankh-Morpork, although rather than an 800-foot-tall (240 m) Tower of Art they have one that is 30 feet (9 m) tall at the bottom, but a one-half mile (800 m) tall at the top. The Archchancellor is named Bill Rincewind, possibly a relation of Rincewind, Unseen University's Professor of Cruel and Unusual Geography and trained coward.

Bugarup has a regular festival in which female impersonators play a notable part, very similar to the Sydney Gay and Lesbian Mardi Gras. It is called the Galah, possibly after a local bird and also a play on "gala"; galah is also Australian slang for someone who is a bit of a fool.

Just off the coast of Fourecks are several islands: the Land of Fog or the Foggy Islands, home of the morporks (a reference to the English translation of New Zealand's Māori name Aotearoa, the Land of the Long White Cloud); and Purdeigh's Island (or Purdeighsland), discovered by the explorer Sir Roderick Purdeigh, who somehow missed the continent itself (in much the same way the Dutch sailor Abel Tasman managed to do with Australia, but did get to have an island named after him).

=== Krull ===
The most notable nation to lie on the Rim is the island kingdom of Krull. The nation's capital is also called Krull (featured in The Colour of Magic), and a local river is known as the Hakrull River (mentioned in Mort).

Its economy is largely based on the capture and salvage of nautical wreckage as it heads towards the Rimfall. To aid in this, the Krullians constructed the Disc's largest manmade object: the Circumfence, a great net that extends across a third of the Disc's perimeter. Now in disrepair, it is still maintained by the occasional guardian, such as Tethis the sea troll.

Due to its unique position, Krull is one of the Disc's main centres of astronomical and astrological learning; indeed until recently, its high priest was also its chief astronomer. Krull possesses a magical University and, unlike the Unseen University, the Krullians have no problem educating female wizards.

Krullians are noted for their habitual nervousness and fatalism, the product of spending their lives overlooking a bottomless black abyss of infinity. On the Disc, the phrase "being on edge" is a reference to the Krullians.

In The Colour of Magic and The Last Hero, it has been shown that life does exist over the Rim of the Discworld, whether that be rimfishers (kingfisher specially adapted to living over the rim) or entire islands populated by the survivors of shipwrecks and their possible descendants.

== Lifeforms ==
Pratchett created or adapted a variety of fictional lifeforms for the Discworld setting, both sentient and non-sentient.

=== Sapient species ===
Pratchett populated Discworld with his own interpretations of numerous classic fantasy and mythological races as well as humans. While humans are portrayed as the main inhabitants of the major Discworld cities, many other races have left their traditional domain and integrated with other, sometimes hostile, species in Discworld's cities. Though Discworld races are often inspired by other authors' versions or by real-world mythologies, they may have different characteristics than their prototypes. For example, on Discworld trolls are made of stone rather than being turned to stone by sunlight like Tolkien's trolls; Discworld Furies have physical similarities to the Furies of Greco-Roman myth, but have different roles. In the list below, Discworld races are followed by the real-world inspiration for them.

Demons
Closely resemble gods and number in the millions. They live in Pandemonium, a city in a spacious dimension on the same space-time continuum as the Disc. Demons are hierarchical, murderously competitive, and staunch traditionalists. Able to peer across multiple dimensions and yet unimaginative, their depiction borrows heavily from Earth lore about demons, including The Book of Revelation, The Divine Comedy, and Paradise Lost. Most choose to seem as disgusting as possible. Demons can be summoned to do a human's bidding. They enjoy being treated ceremoniously and shown respect. Some low-grade demons stay on Discworld permanently, operating devices such as pocket-watches and picture-making devices.
Dragons

Draco nobilis (Noble/Great Dragon)
Huge fierce beasts similar to legends from Earth. They had been thought extinct on the Disc until one attacked Ankh-Morpork; some postulated that they migrated to somewhere with lower gravity. A subspecies of Draco nobilis known as Draco lunaris, was found on Discworld's moon, composed of herbivorous silver dragons of varying sizes. (Other definitions)
Draco vulgaris (Common Swamp Dragon)
Originating from the swamps of Genua, swamp dragons are small excitable creatures thought to descend from Draco nobilis, adapted for a heavy air environment. They are prone to various illnesses and known to fatally explode when stressed. No specimens of the dragon are known to exist in the wild, but they have been bred in captivity as pets for generations, although they can be difficult to take care of.
Draco maritimus immensus
Inspired by the Earth legends of the Midgard Serpent, the serpent is huge and wraps around the rim of the world biting its own tail. It has not been observed on the Discworld, but has been observed from there on other disc-shaped worlds.

Dwarfs
Short, stocky, bearded metal-workers, generally seen wearing leather and chain mail and brandishing axes. Historically they were usually miners and smiths but were also known for being excellent engineers, jewelers, and printers. Male and female dwarfs historically dress the same. Both wear long beards and use masculine names and pronouns. This began to change as some Dwarfs, such as Cheery Littlebottom became more comfortable openly being known as female and dressing in feminine attire. They have parallels with dwarfs from Nordic and Germanic mythology and are similar to the dwarves of J. R. R. Tolkien's Middle-earth.
The legal aspects of Dwarfish Culture are known as "kruk", which translates as "mining law" but also covers laws regarding ownership, marriage, and handling disputes. The Low King, whose authority extends over all dwarfish communities, is the final arbiter in cases where the kruk is unclear. Dwarfs consider their culture more important than genetics, and can consider other species to be Dwarfs, such as in the case of Carrot Ironfoundersson. Dwarfs believe the universe to have been created by Tak, a figure who wrote into being, in order, himself, the Laws, the world, a cave, and a geode; the first Human and Dwarf hatched from the Geode and Tak fashioned the first Troll from what remained when he saw it was trying to come alive. When a Dwarf dies, their tools are melted down and they are buried with a weapon of the finest quality for their journey after death.
Elves
While choosing to appear tall and beautiful to humans, their real appearance is thin and grey with triangular faces and pointy eyes. They navigate and track other creatures through magnetic fields, and as such are heavily pained by iron. They have the ability to manipulate people's minds. The Elves are based on the nastier kind of fairy-folk in European (and other) folklore in addition to aliens in modern pop culture.
Elves come from a parasitic world, referred to as "Elfland" or "Fairyland" ruled by their Queen; it latches onto other worlds to steal from and sometimes enslave the population. The world is currently cold, filled with snow, does not feel like a real place, and nothing grows older there; time passes at a slower pace compared to the Disc the deeper inside it you travel. The world is constantly changing as it contains peoples' dreams and nightmares. (Other definitions)
Gnolls
Members of this race carry everything they own on their backs, some supplemented by carts. Their appearance and smell repels most other races, but their extreme collection habits are credited with keeping the streets of Ankh-Morpork clean (for a limited value of 'clean'). (Other definitions)
Gnomes
Ranging in size from six inches (15 cm) to two feet (60 cm), they are, Pratchett says, more or less interchangeable with the Nac Mac Feegles. (English folkloric definition)
Goblins
Small humanoids who inhabit dank caves. Most other races considered them less than animals and they were often enslaved or exterminated until the events of Snuff, after which they were granted full sentient rights. Goblin spirituality revolves around unggue, the collection of bodily secretions such as earwax in magical pots. (Other definitions)
Gods
Discworld theologians believe there are 3,000 major gods and rising. Gods are called into being by the belief of sentient lifeforms, and their status and power derives from the number and devotion of their believers. Those without followers or very few are known as "small gods". The major gods are in a loose-knit pantheon seated at Cori Celesti, a huge mountain at the Hub of the Disc, in a palace known as "Dunmanifestin". The gods play games with people's souls on a board that is a carving of the disc. Two gods, Fate and Luck (AKA The Lady) are immune to change as there is hardly anybody in the multiverse who doesn't believe in them.

Things from the Dungeon Dimensions (AKA Dark Gods)
These exist in the Dungeon Dimensions, a place outside the multiverse devoid of space and time. They attempt to enter in places where the walls of reality are thin and hate living things intensely. Some wizards have said the Things were once Dark Gods that were driven out of the world.

Golems
Golems are humanoid beings made of clay approximately 7 to 8 feet tall and have fiery triangular eyes. They do not feel hunger, the need to sleep, pain, or boredom, and can survive in extreme temperatures and conditions. They can repair themselves and last for centuries with the oldest specimens being approximately 60,000 years old. Their heads are hollow and contain scrolls or (in the case of the older golems) clay tablets, which contains their directives (to work, not to kill, and to be humble). Their scrolls/tablets are also known as their 'chem'. Golems were highly sought after as employees, working without rest apart from occasional holy days where they leave their posts for a few hours. They were traditionally barred from speaking and could only communicate through writing until the events of Feet of Clay in which Commander Sam Vimes changed their specifications. In the novel, they also began to buy back their freedom and attained independence of thought, deciding what they want their own inner words to be. Discworld's Golems draw inspiration from the Jewish folkloric definition.

Igors
Igors are a humanoid family in Überwald, all of whom are named Igor or Igorina. Igors are known to lurch, shamble, and speak with a lisp. Many have served aristocratic vampires and mad scientists. Igors are skilled in surgery, particularly wound repair and transplants, including of entire limbs. They practice on themselves and leave their body parts to their family when they die to be transplanted. Igors are known to appear patchwork and covered in scars; they may have mismatched eyes, extra thumbs, and other individual alterations. Igorinas use their skill to appear beautiful but leave a detail such as a small scar or decorative stitching on themselves to maintain the family resemblance. They draw inspiration from Igor from the film Frankenstein.
Orcs
A near extinct race who were bred/made from men (as goblins, according to Lord Vetinari, were not vicious enough) to be weapons in a great war. So far only one living orc (by name "Mr Nutt") is known to exist although it is suspected that others exist in the wilds of far Überwald. Mr Nutt initially had to hide his species, even from himself, due to the brutal reputation and legends about orcs. Orcs themselves are shown to be not necessarily 'bad' creatures; given the opportunity they can easily educate themselves, gain wisdom and a great sense of honesty and morality. However, many were forced into battle by men and knew only lives of cruelty thus giving rise to their fearsome reputation. They possess exceptional levels of strength, as well as a special organ hidden deep inside their body that is designed to heal the orc, even capable of bringing them back from some types of death. Featured in Unseen Academicals. (Other definitions)
Trolls
Trolls on the Discworld are large lifeforms best described as living rock, composed of silicon with carbon; they survive on minerals and are named after geology. Trolls are not known to die natural deaths: while they can be killed, as they grow several centuries old they head to the mountains, sit down, think deep thoughts, and eventually merge into the landscape. A Troll's intelligence is dependent on the current temperature, at colder temperatures they can be as smart as Einstein but as it gets warmer their brains overheat. Discworld Trolls draw inspiration from Scandinavian folklore. (Other definitions)

Gargoyles
Gargoyles are a subspecies of Troll that evolved for urban environments; unlike most Trolls, Gargoyles are carnivorous and eat pigeons. They tend to squat on rooftops and are reluctant to move. They enjoy absorbing rainwater from gutters and directing it through their jaws at pedestrians below. Their speech is guttural as their mouths are permanently fixed open. They are often used by the Ankh-Morpork City Watch for surveillance. (Architectural definition)

Undead
Species in the Discworld novels categorised as undead include: Banshees (Celtic folkloric definition), Bogeymen (Other definitions), Ghouls (Other definitions), Ghosts (Other definitions), Mummies (Other definitions), Vampires (Other definitions), Werewolves (Other definitions), and Zombies (Other definitions). In the case of zombies, they are (unlike the classic horror-fiction depiction) fully sentient; for many of them, 'dying at their desk' merely presented a minor inconvenience and a chance to request bereavement leave on behalf of their families. (Other definitions)

Greco-Roman mythological creatures
Centaurs: Believed to be the result of magical mutation. (Greco-Roman mythological definition)
Fauns: Believed to be the result of magical mutation. (Greco-Roman mythological definition)
Furies: Furies are birdlike creatures from Ephebe who can be trained to target a single individual, forcing people away from him/her. In that sense they act like guard dogs, whether their "master" likes it or not. They appear to be barely sentient. Featured in Unseen Academicals. (Greco-Roman mythological definition)
Gorgons: It is mentioned that a Gorgon had joined the Ankh-Morpork City Watch and accidentally turned 3 people to stone. Referenced in Unseen Academicals. (Greek mythological definition)

=== Other life forms ===
Pratchett also created a variety of other fictional life forms on the Discworld. Like the sentient species, these also have real-world connections, although most of these connections take the form of slight changes to existing real-world animals, as shown in the .303 bookworm, which is a worm that evolved differently due to the danger of consuming magic books, or the hermit elephant, which is an elephant who has evolved hermit crab-like living conditions.

== Calendar ==
The Discworld's Unnamed Continent's fictional calendar was first defined in a footnote in The Colour of Magic, and has been expanded upon in later novels and The Discworld Almanak (2004). It has numerous oddities, the chief of which is its length.

The calendar is based on a Great Year, or Astronomical Year, defined as the time it takes for the Disc to revolve once on the backs of the elephants. This lasts 800 days and contains two of each season (Midsummer occurs at a given point when the sun passes directly overhead, midwinter when it passes perpendicularly. However most people, especially farmers, consider four seasons to be a year, so an Agricultural Year of 400 days is used for most purposes.

The agricultural year is divided into 13 months:

- Ick (16 days) (the "Dead Month")
- Offle (32 days)
- February (32 days)
- March (32 days)
- April (32 days)
- May (32 days)
- June (32 days)
- Grune (32 days)
- August (32 days)
- Spune (32 days)
- Sektober (32 days)
- Ember (32 days)
- December (32 days)

Each week has eight days: Sunday, Monday, Tuesday, Wednesday, Thursday, Friday, Saturday and Octeday.

=== Hogswatchnight ===
The first of Ick is Hogswatchday, the Disc's New Year, and the winter solstice from the perspective of Ankh-Morpork. In the Astronomical Year the second midwinter (the year's midway point) is called Crueltide, but due to people using the Agricultural Year this is the same festival.

The 32nd of December, or the day before the New Year, is known as "Hogswatchnight". Traditionally associated with pigs, to ensure the warmth and loving companionship of a pig for the rest of the cold, lonely winter. Many Hogswatch traditions are parodies of those associated with Christmas, including a decorated oak tree in a pot, strings of chicken sausage rolls, and, of course, a visit by the Hogfather. Witches do not leave the house on Hogswatchnight more because of tradition than any practical reasons. The witch Nanny Ogg gets around this by simply inviting everyone to her house for the holiday instead.

In the Omnian religion, Hogswatchnight is called the Fast of St Ossory. Omnians celebrate with fasting, prayer meetings, and the exchange of religious pamphlets.

Hogswatch was also a holiday celebrated in The Dark Side of the Sun, a non-Discworld book by Pratchett.

=== The Glorious Twenty-Fifth of May ===
The 25th of May is quietly celebrated by the survivors of the People's Revolution, which ended the reign of Lord Winder. They wear a sprig of lilac and gather at the Small Gods Cemetery to honour the Watchmen who fell: Cecil Clapman, Ned Coates, Dai Dickins, John Keel, Horace Nancyball, Billy Wiglet, and (albeit temporarily) Reg Shoe.

In the Roundworld (following Terry Pratchett's diagnosis of Alzheimer's disease), Match It For Pratchett called on fans to wear lilacs on 25 May in support of Terry. The date was chosen by Pratchett's assistant, Rob Wilkins, when asked to find "the one day in the year that would cause least offence". He chose the 25th of May because it was Paul Weller's birthday.

=== Usage ===
The calendar in general use in the Sto Plains and Ramtops ("Ankh-Morpork years") uses the agricultural year, and counts from the founding of Unseen University. Years and centuries are also given names by the UU's astrologers. 2005 AM, for instance, is the Year of the Prawn, the fifth year of the Century of the Anchovy. The majority of the Discworld novels are set in the 20th century AM, the Century of the Fruitbat, with the later ones entering the 21st, the Century of the Anchovy.

Other calendars count from various other events, and different schools of astronomy give the years different names. The Theocracy of Muntab has a calendar that counts down, rather than up. The reason for this is unknown, though it is agreed that waiting around for it to reach zero is unwise.

== Languages ==
Pratchett gave the Discworld a variety of fictional languages, though most, if not all, of these are versions of real-world languages renamed to match country names created for the novels. Alongside those of the non-human species such as Dwarfs, Trolls, and orang-utans, the Disc's fictional human languages include:

Morporkian
The language of the Discworld locations of Ankh-Morpork, the Sto Plains, the Ramtops, Genua, and Fourecks (modified). Also, from characters' perspectives, the lingua franca of the Discworld (or, as referenced in Raising Steam, the lingua quirma). Comparable to real-world English.
Latatian
A dead language of the majority of Morporkian-speaking countries; Pratchett did not state how widespread Latatian was in Discworld, but it was in use beyond simply Ankh-Morpork. Used, most often for humour, in novels in the mottoes of noble families, civic organisations, and Guilds of Ankh-Morpork, in legal principles, and by Discworld wizards, doctors, and scientists, the latter a satire of those professions' use of Latin to obfuscate language to laymen. Comparable to real-world Latin, though Pratchett describes it as "very bad, doggy Latin". Examples: Motto of Ankh-Morpork City Watch: originally "Fabricati Diem, Puncti Agunt Celeriter", meaning "Make the day, the moments pass quickly"; due to erosion, this later shortened to "Fabricati Diem, Punc"; that is, Make My Day, Punk. The legal principle Acquiris Quodcumque Rapis — "you get what you grab".
Quirmian
The language of the Discworld country of Quirm. Comparable to real-world French. Often used in elegant restaurants. Featured frequently in Raising Steam.
Ephebian
The language of the Discworld country of Ephebe. Comparable to real-world Greek.
Klatchian
The language(s) from the Discworld continent of Klatch — analogous for anywhere on the Earth from Africa, via South Asia, to South America. Also, the font is changed to a classical Arabian Nights-style when Klatchian is used in the novels. Comparable to real-world Arabic. Featured most prominently in Jingo.
Agatean
The language of the Discworld Agatean Empire on the Counterweight Continent — analogous to the Far East. It is written in complicated pictograms. Minor differences in pronunciation alter word meanings completely. Pratchett sometimes used pictograms in the font of characters speaking Agatean. Comparable to real-world Chinese. Featured most prominently in Interesting Times.
Uberwaldian
The language of the Discworld region of Überwald — analogous of Mittel European to Eastern European areas. The font is changed to German Gothic when Uberwaldean is used in novels. Comparable to real-world German and Slavic languages. Featured most prominently in The Fifth Elephant.

== The Folklore of Discworld ==
The Folklore of Discworld
- Publisher: Doubleday
- Publication date: 2008
- ISBN: 9780385611008

The Folklore of Discworld is a book written by Terry Pratchett and Jacqueline Simpson as an ancillary to the Discworld series of novels. It details the folklore aspects of the Discworld novels and draws parallels with Earth's folklore. It is divided into sections, each with an accompanying sketch by Paul Kidby.

As it was the only Discworld book published in 2008, 25 years after the appearance of the first Discworld book, The Colour of Magic, some of the hardback editions displayed a sticker stating "25 Years of Discworld".

== See also ==
- World Turtle
- The Discworld Mapp
- List of Discworld characters

== Bibliography ==
- Pratchett, Terry; Simpson, Jacqueline (2008). The folklore of Discworld. London: Doubleday. ISBN 978-0-385-61100-8. OCLC 271793056.
