= Discworld II: Missing Presumed...!? =

1996 video game

- European cover art by Discworld novel cover artist Josh Kirby.
- Developer: Perfect Entertainment
- Publishers: Psygnosis (PC, PS); Sega (SS)
- Director: Gregg Barnett
- Producer: Gregg Barnett
- Programmer: David Johnston
- Artists: Paul Mitchell; Nick Pratt
- Writer: Gregg Barnett
- Composer: Rob Lord
- Series: Discworld
- Platforms: DOS, Windows, PlayStation, Saturn
- Release: DOS, Windows: UK: 29 November 1996; NA: 8 January 1997; Saturn: EU: 4 September 1997; PlayStation: NA: 24 September 1997; EU: 14 November 1997
- Genre: Point-and-click adventure
- Mode: Single-player

Discworld II: Missing Presumed...!? (released as Discworld II: Mortality Bytes! in North America) is a 1996 point-and-click adventure game based on Terry Pratchett's series of fantasy novels set on the mythical Discworld, and sequel to the 1995 video game of the same name. The story sees players assume the role of Rincewind the "wizzard" as he becomes burdened with the task of finding Death and coercing him out of an impromptu retirement and back into his regular duties. The game's plot borrows from a number of Discworld books, including key elements from Reaper Man and Moving Pictures.

The game was developed in 1996 by Perfect Entertainment and published by Psygnosis for the PC, and featured the return of Eric Idle in his role as Rincewind in the previous game. The game was ported to the PlayStation and Sega Saturn in 1997. The Saturn port was published by Sega and was exclusive for the European market. The game received positive reviews across Europe, but fared less well in North America.

== Gameplay ==
Discworld II is a third-person point-and-click graphic adventure game. In each location, players can examine and interact with people and objects, solving puzzles by finding items needed by people or to retrieve other objects, with the game's story divided into four acts. Items can be stored in one of two inventories: Rincewind's, who can carry two items; and the Luggage's, which can carry an infinite amount. Conversations are mainly carried out through the choice of four options, or attitudes, that Rincewind can take: greeting, sarcasm, questioning, and musing – though additional topics can appear for certain characters as the player explores the game's world. Overhead maps are provided for traveling between locations – one for the city of Ankh-Morpork, and another for outside the city – with new locations becoming available as the game progresses.

Players can add items to the Luggage, or leave locations quickly, by double-clicking either. Like most other point-and-click adventure games, each act of the story primarily focuses on players finding and interacting with the set of items and characters needed in order to progress the story.

== Plot ==
One night whilst returning from a pub with The Librarian, Rincewind witnesses an assassin plant a cart bomb in the Fools' Guild and attempts to disarm it. However, he accidentally causes the bomb to detonate, destroying the guild and killing its occupants. Unknowingly, the blast also catches out Death whilst attending to his duties, ejecting him from the saddle of his horse and causing him to disappear without trace. His absence swiftly leads to the souls of the departed throughout Ankh-Morpork remaining bound to their bodies and becoming undead. After witnessing Windle Poons suffer the same fate at his appointed time of death, the wizards of Unseen University suspect what the cause is and decide to invoke a ritual to summon Death, with the Archchancellor tasking Rincewind to collect the needed items for it.

The ritual successfully summons Death to them for a brief time, only for him to reveal that he is on indefinite vacation, having grown disillusioned with the thanklessness of his task. The Archchancellor fails to reason with him to return to work, and assigns Rincewind to locate him and return him to his duties. However, Death refuses when found, only agreeing to do so if he receives credit for the work he undertakes for mortals. To fulfil his desire, Rincewind arranges for him to become a star in his own film – referred to as 'clickies' on the Discworld – employing Cut-Me-Own-Throat Dibbler as the director, and securing various props and other items needed to complete filming. The finished production is initially poorly received at its screening, until Rincewind splices in footage of an Elf Queen that he took as a request during his work, which hypnotizes the crowd into loving the film.

The success of the movie causes Death to renege on his agreement and opt to retire from his duties to continue a career as a film star. Left with no choice, Rincewind travels to Death's domain to take over from him, much to the displeasure of Death's butler Albert. After proving himself by completing a series of tests set by Albert, Rincewind takes over the job, but is appalled when his first assignment is to reap the soul of Death himself, after he is assassinated during a publicity affair. Refusing to do so, Rincewind abandons the job and revives Death by pouring fresh sand into his hourglass. After a further screening of the film causes a mishap involving the Elf Queen emerging in Ankh-Morpork as a giant and taking The Librarian, Death resumes his duties after Rincewind rescues his friend, and reaps Windle's soul after he is crushed by the Elf Queen's body. As the pair head for the afterlife, Windle recalls the many ways he killed himself, before remarking how his second death was a good way to go.

== Development ==
The game, on two CD-ROMs (one for the console versions), features hand-drawn environments and animations, full voice acting and a simple interface. Although the game does not run on XP systems onwards, the game can still be played on modern systems with the ScummVM or DOSBox emulators. ScummVM can take the real game data such as scripting information or scenes, and collate them together displaying it all on its own version of Discworld 2's Tinsel engine.

A number of changes were made to the voice cast since the previous Discworld game. While Eric Idle reprised his role as Rincewind, Tony Robinson did not return, and Jon Pertwee died before production could begin. Rob Brydon and Kate Robbins did return, however, and Young Ones actor Nigel Planer was added to the cast. The Death of Rats is voiced by "Katharine the crocodile", and Rob Brydon seemingly provided the new voices for Dibbler, Windle Poons and Havelock Vetinari (The Patrician).

== Reception ==
Reception

Review scores
| Publication | Score |
|---|---|
| Electronic Gaming Monthly | 7.125/10 (PS1) |
| GameSpot | 6.8/10 (WIN) |
| Next Generation | 3/5 (WIN) |
| PC Games (US) | B (WIN) |
| Sega Saturn Magazine | 82% (SAT) |

Like its predecessor, Discworld II was a "massive hit" in Europe and the United Kingdom, according to director Gregg Barnett. However, the game was less successful in the United States.

Discworld II was very well received by professional critics, scoring an 80.5% average (for PC) on GameRankings, based on six reviews. It was ranked 73rd on Adventure Gamers' list of the "Top 100 All-Time Adventure Games" in 2011. The site's staff said that while the puzzles were not standout, they were at least more logical than those of the original Discworld, and that the game held up better in modern times than it did at the time of release, since contemporary PCs were better able to handle its sophisticated cartoon graphics. "That's Death", a song in the game written and sung by Eric Idle and arranged, produced, and played on by Tom Scott, was picked by PC Gamer as one of the best songs in PC gaming.

Contemporary praise for the game largely centred on its humour and voice acting, though many critics also remarked that some of the conversations are overlong. Crispin Boyer of Electronic Gaming Monthly described the game as "so pee-in-your-pants funny that it never really gets boring. The game is constantly poking fun at itself (and, occasionally, at you). Its mix of low-brow fart jokes and high-brow social commentary should appeal to everyone." The cartoon-like animation also impressed most critics. The primary criticism was that the puzzles are so abstract that they can drive the player to resort to trial-and-error, though Sega Saturn Magazine, one of the few publications unamused by the game's humour, contended that "most of the puzzles and tasks are just about hard enough, without being too obscure and difficult, and there's plenty of hints and clues to nudge you in the right direction should you get confused." PlayStation Magazine gave it a score of 7/10, but recommended it only for Pratchett's fans. Next Generation stated that "if you're not a fan of the books, you'll get frustrated by many of the puzzles. On the other hand, if you are a fan of the books, you might not like how the characters and landscapes are represented. It's rare when a book can be translated well to other media, and the Discworld novels are no exception."
