= Sourcery =

1988 Discworld novel by Terry Pratchett

- First edition
- Author: Terry Pratchett
- Cover artist: Josh Kirby
- Language: English
- Series: Discworld; 5th novel – 3rd Rincewind story
- Subject: Wizards and sorcery; Apocalypse; Characters: Rincewind; Locations: Ankh-Morpork, Klatch
- Genre: Fantasy
- Publisher: Victor Gollancz Ltd in association with Colin Smythe
- Publication date: 26 May 1988
- ISBN: 0-575-04217-6
- Preceded by: Mort
- Followed by: Wyrd Sisters

Sourcery is a fantasy novel by British writer Terry Pratchett, the fifth book in his Discworld series, published in 1988.

== Premise ==
On the Discworld, "sourcerers"—wizards who are sources of magic, and thus immensely more powerful than normal wizards—were the main cause of the Great Mage Wars that left areas of the Disc uninhabitable. As eight is a powerful magical number on Discworld, men born as the eighth son of an eighth son are commonly wizards. Since sourcerers are born the eighth son of an eighth son of an eighth son, they are "wizards squared". To prevent the creation of sourcerers, therefore, wizards are not allowed to marry or have children.

There are many references to geasa in the text, which are idiosyncratic curses, vows or obligations placed upon a person (usually a hero, such as Cúchulainn in Irish mythology).

== Synopsis ==
A dying wizard who flouted the rule against having children makes a bargain with Death that allows his spirit to inhabit his staff, which he passes on to his eighth son, who is born a sourcerer. Under the influence of the staff, this child prodigy travels to Ankh-Morpork and initiates a plan for wizards to rule the Discworld, with himself at their head. Because the sourcerer's power is threatening to destroy the Discworld altogether, a small band—Rincewind the Wizard, Nijel the Destroyer and Conina the Hairdresser, daughter of Cohen the Barbarian—attempt to thwart those plans.

== Plot ==
Death comes to collect the soul of Ipslore the Red, a wizard who was banished from Unseen University for marrying and having children. Bitter over his exile and the death of his wife, Ipslore vows revenge upon the wizards through his eighth son, Coin. As the eighth son of a wizard who himself is an eighth son, Coin is born a sourcerer, a wizard who generates new magic rather than drawing it from the world, effectively making him the most powerful wizard on the Disc. At the moment of his death, Ipslore transfers his spirit into his wizard's staff, which is passed to Coin, preventing Death from collecting Ipslore's soul (since damaging the staff to do so would kill Coin) and allowing Ipslore to influence his son.

Eight years later, Virrid Wayzygoose, the Archchancellor-designate of Unseen University in Ankh-Morpork, is murdered before his induction by Coin, who then forces his way into the university's Great Hall. After Coin bests one of the top wizards in the University, he is welcomed by the majority of the wizards. Rincewind, The Luggage and the Librarian miss Coin's arrival, having fled the University shortly beforehand after the foreboding departure of all of its magically-influenced pest populations. While they are at the Mended Drum, Conina, a professional thief and a daughter of Discworld legend Cohen the Barbarian, arrives holding a box containing the Archchancellor's hat, which she has procured from the room of Wayzygoose, and which possesses a kind of sentience as a result of being worn by hundreds of Archchancellors. Under the direction of the hat, which sees Coin as a threat to wizardry and the very world, Conina forces Rincewind to come with her and take a boat to the city of Al Khali, where the hat claims there is someone fit to wear it.

In Ankh-Morpork, the wizards are made more powerful due to Coin's presence drawing more magic into the Discworld. Under Coin's direction, the wizards take over Ankh-Morpork—transforming it into a pristine city and turning the Patrician, Lord Vetinari, into a newt—and make plans to take over the world. Elsewhere, Rincewind, Conina and the Luggage end up in the company of Creosote, the seriph of Al Khali, and Abrim, his treacherous vizier. The trio are eventually separated; Rincewind is thrown into the snake pit, where he meets Nijel the Destroyer, a barbarian hero in training. Conina is taken to Creosote's harem, where the Seriph has his concubines tell him stories. The Luggage, having been scorned by Conina, runs away and gets drunk, before killing and eating several creatures in the desert.

Coin eventually declares Unseen University and the various wizarding orders obsolete and orders the Library to be burnt down, claiming that Wizardry no longer requires such things. A group of wizards then attack Al Khali, with the sheer amount of magic created by their arrival temporarily putting Rincewind into a trance and enabling him to use magic, allowing him and Nijel to escape the snake pit. They join up with Creosote and Conina, the latter immediately falling in love with Nijel, and they encounter Abrim, who had put on the Archchancellor's hat hoping to gain power from it, only to be possessed instead. Having the experience of many previous Archchancellors, the hat proves an even match for Sourcery-empowered wizards, fighting off a group of them and enlisting others to its cause. As this takes place, Rincewind, Conina, Nijel and Creosote find a magical flying carpet in the palace's treasury, and use it to escape the palace as it gets destroyed by the possessed Abrim building his own tower.

With the orders no longer around to keep the wizards in check, wizards across the Discworld go to war with one another, threatening to destroy the world completely. Upon hearing Creosote express anti-wizard sentiments, an angry and humiliated Rincewind abandons the group, taking the flying carpet and making his way to the University, where he learns that the Librarian has saved the library books by hiding them in the ancient Tower of Art. The Librarian convinces Rincewind to stop Coin, and he goes off to face the Sourcerer with a sock containing a half-brick. Back in Al Khali, the Luggage, blaming the Archchancellor's hat for everything it has endured, forces its way into Abrim's tower. Distracted by the Luggage, the possessed vizier is killed by the Ankh-Morpork wizards, with the tower and the Archchancellor's hat getting destroyed in the process.

Despite his victory, Coin becomes concerned when he is told that wizards rule under the Discworld Gods. He traps the gods in an alternate reality, which shrinks to become a large pearl, unknowingly causing the Ice Giants, a race of beings who had been imprisoned by the gods, to escape their prison, whereupon they begin strolling across the Discworld, freezing everything in their path. Rincewind confronts Coin soon after this. The Sourcerer is amused, but unthreatened, by Rincewind attempting to fight him, prompting Ipslore to try to force Coin to kill him. Rincewind eventually convinces Coin to throw the staff away, but Ipslore's power is channelled against that of his son. The other wizards leave the tower as Rincewind rushes forward, grabbing the child and sending both of them to the Dungeon Dimensions while Death strikes the staff and takes Ipslore's soul. Rincewind orders Coin to return to the University and, using his other sock filled with sand, attacks the Creatures from the Dungeon Dimensions as a distraction to ensure Coin's escape. The Gods are subsequently set free, stopping the march of the Ice Giants. As the Librarian helps Coin escape, the Luggage charges into the Dungeon Dimensions after Rincewind.

Coin returns the University and Ankh-Morpork to the way they were before he came. After Conina and Nijel travel to the University looking for Rincewind, Coin uses his magic to make them forget him and live happily ever after together. Recognising that he is too powerful to remain in the world, Coin steps into a dimension of his own making and is not seen on the Discworld again. The Librarian takes Rincewind's battered hat, which was left behind when he went into the Dungeon Dimensions, and places it on a pedestal in the Library. The narrator states, "A wizard...will always come back for his hat".

== Characters ==
- Marmaric Carding
- Coin
- Conina
- The Luggage
- Nijel the Destroyer
- Rincewind
- Spelter

== Adaptations ==
In 2010, Terry Pratchett stated that Sourcery would be the fifth Discworld novel to be adapted for Sky One, although he had initially wanted to adapt Making Money. However, he thought that it might work better as a film, and that he could have fun with characters like Nijel the Destroyer.

== Reception ==
Critical reception for the novel was positive. Toronto Star's Paul Stuewe writes that Pratchett "demonstrates a flair for cerebral as well as slapstick comedy."

A reviewer from Publishers Weekly felt that Sourcery was skillfully written, stating "Pratchett does not merely play with words, he juggles shrewd observations with aplomb." The reviewer added that "the author never takes himself or his message too seriously, and maintains a feather-light touch throughout."

Tom Hutchinson, writing for The Times, thought that Sourcery presents a "memorable account of how we adapt power before it adapts us" and "may well be considered [Pratchett's] masterpiece."

Thomas M. Wagner from SF Reviews.net gave the book a 3.5/5 rating, commenting that the story "has Pratchett's trademark lightning pacing, and it fires gags and one-liners at you as if from a fully automatic Uzi." He stated that though he found most of Sourcery funny, "it was very evident to me that Pratchett was, at this early stage of the series, barely scratching the surface of what his considerable wit is capable of."

Reading order guide
Preceded by Mort	5th Discworld Novel	Succeeded by Wyrd Sisters
Preceded by The Light Fantastic	3rd Rincewind Story; Published in 1988	Succeeded by ~~Faust~~ Eric
