= The Colour of Magic =

1983 Discworld novel by Terry Pratchett

- First edition
- Author: Terry Pratchett
- Cover artist: Alan Smith
- Language: English
- Series: Discworld; 1st novel – 1st Rincewind story
- Subject: Fantasy Role-playing games; Characters: Rincewind Twoflower The Luggage; Locations: Ankh-Morpork, Krull
- Genre: Fantasy
- Publisher: Colin Smythe
- Publication date: 24 November 1983
- Awards: 93rd in the Big Read
- ISBN: 0-86140-324-X
- Followed by: The Light Fantastic

The Colour of Magic is a 1983 fantasy comedy novel by Terry Pratchett, and is the first book of the Discworld series. The first printing of the British edition consisted of only 506 copies. Pratchett has described it as "an attempt to do for the classical fantasy universe what Blazing Saddles did for Westerns."

== Plot summary ==
=== Setting ===
The story takes place on the Discworld, a planet-sized flat disc carried through space on the backs of four gargantuan elephants – Berilia, Tubul, Great T'Phon and Jerakeen – who themselves stand on the shell of Great A'Tuin, a gigantic star turtle. The surface of the disc contains oceans and continents, and with them, civilizations, cities, forests and mountains.

=== Summary ===
The story begins in Ankh-Morpork, the biggest city on the Discworld. The main character is an incompetent and cynical wizard named Rincewind, who is hired as a guide to naive Twoflower, an insurance clerk from the Agatean Empire who has come to visit Ankh-Morpork. Thanks to the abundance of gold in his homeland, Twoflower, though only a clerk, is immensely rich compared to inhabitants of Ankh-Morpork. Initially attempting to flee with his advance payment for agreeing to be Twoflower's guide, Rincewind is captured by the Patrician of Ankh-Morpork, who forces him to protect Twoflower, lest the tourist's death provoke the Agatean Emperor into invading Ankh-Morpork. After Twoflower is kidnapped by a gang of thieves and taken to the Broken Drum tavern, Rincewind stages a rescue alongside the Luggage, an indestructible, enchanted and sentient chest belonging to Twoflower. Before this, Twoflower convinces the Broken Drum's landlord to take out a fire insurance policy at an inflated valuation (Twoflower having a poor grasp of local prices). When the landlord inevitably burns down the tavern to claim the money, the fire spreads and destroys the whole of Ankh-Morpork. Rincewind and Twoflower escape in the chaos.

Rincewind and Twoflower travel towards the city of Quirm, unaware that their adventures on this journey are actually the subject of a boardgame played by the Gods of the Discworld. The pair are separated when they are attacked by a mountain troll summoned by Offler the Crocodile God. The ignorant Twoflower ends up being led to the Temple of Bel-Shamharoth, a being said to be the opposite of both good and evil, while Rincewind ends up imprisoned in a dryad-inhabited tree in the woods, where he watches the events in Bel-Shamharoth's temple through a magical portal. The pair are reunited when Rincewind escapes into the temple through the portal, and they encounter Hrun the Barbarian, a parody of heroes in the Sword and sorcery genre. The trio are attacked and nearly killed by Bel-Shamharoth, but escape when Rincewind accidentally blinds the creature with Twoflower's magical picture box. Hrun agrees to travel with and protect Twoflower and Rincewind in exchange for heroic pictures of him from the picture box.

The trio visit the Wyrmberg, an upside-down mountain which is home to dragon-riders who summon their dragons by imagining them, and are separated when the riders attack them. Rincewind escapes capture but is forced by Kring, Hrun's sentient magical sword, to attempt to rescue his friends. Twoflower is imprisoned within the Wyrmberg, and because of his fascination with dragons, is able to summon one greater than those of the Wyrmberg riders, whom he names Ninereeds, allowing him to escape captivity and save Rincewind from being killed in a duel with one of the three heirs of the Wyrmburg. Twoflower, Rincewind and Ninereeds snatch Hrun, but as they attempt to escape into the skies, Twoflower passes out from the lack of oxygen, causing Ninereeds to disappear. Hrun is saved by Liessa, but Rincewind and Twoflower find themselves falling to their deaths. In desperation, Rincewind manages to use the Wyrmberg's power to temporarily summon a passenger jet from the real world, before he and Twoflower fall into the ocean.

The two of them are taken to the edge of the Discworld by the ocean currents and nearly carried over, but they are caught by the Circumfence, a huge net built by the nation of Krull to catch sea life and flotsam washed in from the rest of the Discworld. They are rescued by Tethis the sea troll, a being composed of water who had fallen off the edge of his own world and onto the Discworld, where he was subsequently enslaved by the Krullians. The Krullians then take Rincewind and Twoflower to their capital, where they inform them that they intend to use a space capsule to launch over the edge of the Disc in order to learn the sex of Great A'Tuin, and that they also intend to sacrifice Rincewind and Twoflower in order to appease the god Fate, who insisted on their sacrifice after they cost him the earlier game. Rincewind and Twoflower attempt to escape, but end up stealing the capsule, which is launched with Twoflower inside, the tourist wishing to see the other worlds of the universe. Rincewind is unable to get into the capsule in time, and falls off the Disc alongside it, the Luggage following them soon after.

The story segues into the beginning of The Light Fantastic.

== Characters ==
- Bel-Shamharoth aka "The Soul Eater", "The Sender of Eight", a Chthonic god of the Dungeon Dimensions.
- Hrun, the Barbarian, aka Hrun of Chimeria
- Liessa Wyrmbidder aka Lianna
- the Luggage
- Rincewind, and his Roundworld alias, Dr Rjinswand
- Twoflower, and his Roundworld alias, Jack Zweiblumen
- Death

== Structure ==
The Colour of Magic is one of the few Discworld novels to be divided into sections or chapters, the others being Pyramids, Going Postal, and Making Money, along with the Discworld novels for younger readers, which consist of the five Tiffany Aching books (The Wee Free Men, A Hat Full of Sky, Wintersmith, I Shall Wear Midnight, and The Shepherd's Crown) and The Amazing Maurice and his Educated Rodents.

The sections are:

- The Colour of Magic – Prologue
- The Colour of Magic
- The Sending of Eight – Prologue
- The Sending of Eight
- The Lure of the Wyrm
- Close to the Edge

The four main parts are lengthy, and have been likened to short stories or novellas rather than chapters.

In the section "The Colour of Magic", the characters Bravd and The Weasel relate to Fafhrd and the Gray Mouser from Fritz Leiber's Sword series. "The Sending of Eight" has Lovecraftian references, and "The Lure of the Wyrm" parodies Anne McCaffrey's Dragonflight.

== Adaptations ==
=== Graphic novel ===
A graphic novel, illustrated by Steven Ross and adapted by Scott Rockwell, was first published as a four-part comic in 1991 by the Innovative Corporation, of Wheeling, WV and then published as a single volume by Corgi on 12 November 1992. Part 1 was originally announced for publication by Innovative on 10 December 1990, but it was delayed as Terry Pratchett had not been shown the artwork for approval as contractually required and disliked it, so the first issue had to be redrawn.

The graphic novel is split up into several chapters like the book, and is faithful to the source material in that it is built up like classic barbarian stories (in this case comics à la Red Sonja). Crucial differences between the book and comic include the cutting-out of some of the adventures in Ankh-Morpork and Krull, along with combining the characters of Galder Weatherwax and Ymper Trymon. Also, in the book, the female Dragonriders are described as being topless, as barbarian women in fiction tend to be. However, in the graphic novel the women wear chain-mail chestpieces as well as the clothing described in the book. It has been published in hardcover, along with the graphic novel of The Light Fantastic, as The Discworld Graphic Novels (ISBN 9780061685965).

=== TV adaptation ===
The Mob Film Company and Sky One have produced a two-part adaptation, combining both The Colour of Magic and The Light Fantastic, directed by Vadim Jean and broadcast over Easter, 2008. David Jason starred in the role of Rincewind. Sean Astin, best known for his role as Samwise Gamgee in The Lord of the Rings film series, took the role of Twoflower. Christopher Lee took over the role of Death from Ian Richardson (a role Lee had previously played in the animated series Soul Music and Wyrd Sisters).

=== Computer game ===
The plot was adapted for a text adventure computer game in 1986, by Delta 4 and released by Piranha, a Macmillan subsidiary, in Amstrad/CDC, Commodore and Spectrum formats.

== Reception ==
Dave Langford reviewed The Colour of Magic for White Dwarf #64, and stated that "It's one of those horrible, antisocial books which impel the reader to buttonhole friends and quote bits at them. My ceiling is covered with brown spots from when I tried to read Pratchett's jokes and drink beer at the same time. Only native sadism makes me recommend this disgraceful work."

Colin Greenland reviewed The Colour of Magic for Imagine magazine, and stated that "Terry Pratchett does for sword and sorcery what Douglas Adams did for science fiction."

In 2015, Sam Jordison at The Guardian gave a positive review of The Colour of Magic. He discussed the arguments that it may not be the best introduction to the series: later books are more highly regarded; it does little to develop its characters and ideas; and modern readers may not be familiar with the "pre-1990s fantasy conventions" it lampoons. However, he argued that the book is "still more than worth reading in and of itself", praising its gags and satire. "Indeed, The Colour of Magic is the perfect introduction because it leaves me hungry for more."

== Reviews ==
- Review by Faren Miller (1983) in Locus, #274 November 1983
- Review by W. D. Stevens (1984) in SF & Fantasy Review, March 1984
- Review by Ken Lake (1984) in Vector 119
- Review by Baird Searles (1984) in Isaac Asimov's Science Fiction Magazine, May 1984
- Review by Martyn Taylor (1985) in Paperback Inferno, #53
- Review by Ornoth D. A. Liscomb [as by 'Orny' Liscomb] (1985) in FSFnet, v2 #2, 1985
- Review by Robert Coulson (1986) in Amazing Stories, January 1986
- Review by Don D'Ammassa (1986) in Science Fiction Chronicle, #81 June 1986
- Review by Matthew Scott Winslow (2004) in Deep Magic, #28, September 2004
- Review by Stephen E. Andrews and Nick Rennison (2009) in 100 Must-Read Fantasy Novels
- Review by Bill Fawcett and Jody Lynn Nye (2016) in Galaxy's Edge, Issue 21: July 2016

Reading order guide
Preceded by None	1st Discworld Novel	Succeeded by The Light Fantastic
Preceded by None	1st Rincewind Story; Published in 1983	Succeeded by The Light Fantastic
