= The Light Fantastic =

1986 novel by Terry Pratchett

- First edition
- Author: Terry Pratchett
- Cover artist: Josh Kirby
- Language: English
- Series: Discworld; 2nd novel – 2nd Rincewind story
- Subject: Fantasy clichés; Characters: Rincewind, Twoflower, The Luggage, Cohen the Barbarian; Locations: Ankh-Morpork, Dungeon Dimensions
- Genre: Fantasy
- Publisher: Colin Smythe
- Publication date: 2 June 1986
- ISBN: 0-86140-203-0
- Preceded by: The Colour of Magic
- Followed by: Equal Rites

The Light Fantastic is a comic fantasy novel by Terry Pratchett, the second of the Discworld series. It was published on 2 June 1986, the first printing being of 1,034 copies. The title is taken from L'Allegro, a poem by John Milton, and refers to dancing lightly with extravagance, although in the novel it is explained as "the light that lies on the far side of darkness, the light fantastic. It was a rather disappointing purple colour."

The events of the novel are a direct continuation of those in the preceding book, The Colour of Magic.

== Plot summary ==
The book begins shortly after the ending of The Colour of Magic, with wizard Rincewind, the tourist Twoflower, and the Luggage falling from the Discworld. They are saved when the Octavo, the most powerful book of magic on the Discworld, readjusts reality to prevent the loss of one of its eight spells. The spell had lodged in Rincewind's head when he was a student at Unseen University. Rincewind, Twoflower and the Luggage end up in the Forest of Skund. The wizards of Ankh-Morpork use the Rite of Ashk-Ente to summon Death to find an explanation for the Octavo's actions. Death warns them that the Discworld will soon be destroyed by a huge red star unless the eight spells of the Octavo are read.

Several orders of wizards travel to the forest of Skund to capture Rincewind, who is currently staying with Twoflower and the Luggage in a gingerbread house in the forest. In the subsequent chaos, Rincewind and Twoflower escape on an old witch's broom. The Archchancellor of Unseen University attempts to obtain the spell, but accidentally summons the Luggage on top of him, crushing him to death. His apprentice, Ymper Trymon, uses the opportunity to advance his own power, intending to obtain the eight spells for himself.

Rincewind and Twoflower encounter a sect of druids who have assembled a "computer" from large standing stones, and learn of the approaching red star. As Twoflower attempts to stop the druids from sacrificing a young woman named Bethan, Cohen the Barbarian, an octogenarian parody of Conan, attacks the druids. Twoflower is poisoned in the battle, forcing Rincewind to travel to Death's Domain to rescue him. The pair narrowly avoid being killed by Ysabell, Death's adopted daughter. As they escape, the Octavo tells Rincewind that it had arranged for its eighth spell to escape into his head, to ensure the spells could not be used before the appointed time.

Rincewind and Twoflower travel with Cohen and Bethan to a nearby town, where the toothless Cohen leaves to have dentures made, having learned of them from Twoflower. Rincewind, Twoflower and Bethan are attacked by a mob of people who believe the star is coming to destroy the Discworld in response to the presence of magic. The trio escape into a magical travelling shop, one of many that sell strange and sinister goods and vanish inexplicably the next time a customer tries to find them. These shops travel the multiverse, set adrift by a sorcerer's curse on the shopkeeper for not having something in stock. The three are able to return to Ankh-Morpork via the shop.

As the star comes nearer and the magic on the Discworld weakens, Trymon tries to put the seven spells still in the Octavo into his mind, in an attempt to save the world and gain ultimate power. However, the spells prove too strong for him and his mind becomes a door into the "Dungeon Dimensions", home of terrifying eldritch creatures. Rincewind and Twoflower manage to kill the now-mutated Trymon.

Rincewind reads all eight of the Octavo's spells aloud. This causes eight moons of the red star to crack open, birthing eight infant world-turtles. They follow their parent Great A'Tuin, the massive turtle who carries the Discworld, on a course away from the star. The Octavo falls and is eaten by the Luggage.

Cohen and Bethan leave to get married. Twoflower and Rincewind part company as Twoflower decides to return home, leaving the Luggage with Rincewind as a parting gift. Rincewind decides to re-enroll in the university, believing that with the spell out of his head, he will finally be able to learn magic.

== Characters ==
- Rincewind - the most pathetic wizard on the disc
- Twoflower - a naive tourist from the exotic Counterweight Continent
- the Luggage - a sentient trunk with a homicidal attitude
- DEATH - the Grim Reaper, speaks for itself doesn't it?
- Ymper Trymon - an ambitious wizard in the Unseen University
- Galder Weatherwax - ArchChancellor of the Unseen University
- The Librarian - speak for itself
- Cohen - a very old hero
- Bethan - a druid virgin sacrifice who doesn't want to be saved

== Releases ==
The cover of a United States paperback release features a mistake, with Cohen's name stated to be "Conan".

== Adaptations ==
=== Graphic novel ===
A graphic novel adapted by Scott Rockwell and illustrated by Steven Ross and Joe Bennet, was first published as a four-part comic in June, August, December 1992 and February 1993 by the Innovative Corporation of Wheeling WV, before being published as a single volume by Corgi on 4 November 1993. It has been published in hardcover along with the graphic novel of The Colour of Magic, as The Discworld Graphic Novels. (ISBN 978-0-06-168596-5)

=== TV adaptation ===
The Mob Film Company and Sky One produced a miniseries, combining both The Colour of Magic and The Light Fantastic, broadcast on Easter Sunday and Monday 2008. Sir David Jason played the part of Rincewind. He was joined by David Bradley as Cohen the Barbarian, Sean Astin as Twoflower, Tim Curry as Trymon, and Christopher Lee taking over the role of Death from Ian Richardson (a role he previously portrayed in the animated series Soul Music and Wyrd Sisters).

The production team wanted to get fans involved in the adaptation so some of the extras used in the adaptation (in mob scenes and during the fight in the Broken Drum) were Discworld fans who were selected via various website and Newsletters.

== Reception ==
Dave Langford reviewed The Light Fantastic for White Dwarf #83, and stated that "Abandoning the cruel fantasy parodies of his previous book, Pratchett leans more heavily on the one-line gags: the result isn't as pointedly funny, but still evokes more laughs than anything else around. Especially Thrud."

Wendy Graham reviewed The Light Fantastic for Adventurer magazine and stated that "The Light Fantastic dropped through the letter box of Graham Towers recently with an optimistic prognosis and I was delighted to find, a), that the book lives up to my expectations, and b). it doesn't seem to be written with another book in mind (trilogies etc. bring me out in spots)."

Wendy Graham reviewed The Light Fantastic for Adventurer magazine and stated that "The book that does to fantasy what Douglas Adams does to science fiction."

== Reviews ==
- Review by Barbara Davies (1986) in Vector 134
- Review by Pauline E. Dungate [as by Pauline Morgan] (1986) in Fantasy Review, November 1986
- Review by Ken Lake (1986) in Paperback Inferno, #63
- Review by Don D'Ammassa (1987) in Science Fiction Chronicle, #97 October 1987
- Review by John C. Bunnell (1988) in Dragon Magazine, July 1988
- Review by James Cawthorn and Michael Moorcock (1988) in Fantasy: The 100 Best Books
- Review [French] by Marc Lemosquet (1993) in Yellow Submarine, #106

Reading order guide
Preceded by The Colour of Magic	2nd Discworld Novel	Succeeded by Equal Rites
Preceded by The Colour of Magic	2nd Rincewind Story; Published in 1986	Succeeded by Sourcery
