= The Last Continent =

1998 Discworld novel by Terry Pratchett

- First edition
- Author: Terry Pratchett
- Cover artist: Josh Kirby
- Language: English
- Series: Discworld; 22nd novel – 6th Rincewind story
- Subject: Australia, evolution; Characters: Rincewind, Unseen University Staff; Locations: FourEcks, Unseen University
- Genre: Fantasy
- Publisher: Doubleday, London
- Publication date: 1998
- ISBN: 0-385-40989-3 (hardcover)
- Preceded by: Jingo
- Followed by: Carpe Jugulum

The Last Continent is a fantasy novel by British writer Terry Pratchett, the twenty-second book in his Discworld series. First published in 1998, it mocks the aspects of time travel such as the grandfather paradox and the Ray Bradbury short story "A Sound of Thunder". It also parodies Australian people and aspects of Australian culture, such as Crocodile Dundee, The Adventures of Priscilla, Queen of the Desert and Mad Max films, the Australian beer XXXX, Vegemite, thongs, cork hats, the Peach Melba, Skippy the Bush Kangaroo, the bushranger Ned Kelly, the Henley-on-Todd Regatta, and the Australian songs "Waltzing Matilda", "Down Under", and "The Man From Snowy River".

== Plot summary ==
The story opens weeks after the events of Interesting Times, in which Rincewind is magically transported to the continent of XXXX. Here he meets the magical kangaroo Scrappy, who explains to Rincewind that he is fated to bring back the rain, and end the eons-long drought.

Meanwhile, the senior wizards are trying to find a cure for the Librarian's magical malady, which causes him to transform into a native object, such as a book, when near a library, whenever he sneezes. The Lecturer in Recent Runes suggests they interrogate Rincewind, as he once worked closely with the Librarian and seemed to know more about him than anyone else.

Back in the present, Rincewind ends up wrongfully arrested for sheep theft and taken to Bugarup, where he is hoping to find a ship to escape on. The people of Bugarup regard sheep thieves as folk heroes and encourage Rincewind to escape, while not actually allowing him to. He finds a hidden message on the ceiling of his holding cell, telling him, "G'day mate, check the hinges." He discovers that he is able to lift the door off its hinges and escape.

After several comical misadventures, the University wizards reach Fourecks and meet the Creator of Fourecks. The Librarian, meanwhile, steals the Creator's bullroarer and spins it, causing the drought Rincewind is in the process of stopping. The wizards are then frozen in time for thousands of years by the stray magic left over from creating the continent.

Rincewind, having escaped from gaol, meets up with two female impersonators, Darleen and Letitia, and a woman named Neilette. The "ladies" guide him to the University of Fourecks. Rincewind figures out how to free the wizards. The wizards attempt to find a way to bring back the rain but are unsuccessful. As they are sitting around, Rincewind idly twirls the bullroarer, which soon begins to fly faster and farther than it should. Rincewind lets go and the bullroarer flies off; immediately, it begins to rain. Having saved Fourecks, Rincewind and the wizards return to Ankh-Morpork by ship.

== Reception ==
The SF Site described it as "(l)oads of sarcasm, an outrageous plot, and tons of sheer fun". Infinity Plus was less positive, recommending that Discworld newcomers start elsewhere, and stating that it "falls below (Pratchett's) normal very high standard on several counts" because although it is "great fun" and "worth buying", it "doesn't hang together as a plot, as an unfolding story".

Other reviews:

- (Polish): Nowa Fantastyka 5/2006, p.71

Reading order guide
Preceded by Jingo	22nd Discworld Novel	Succeeded by Carpe Jugulum
Preceded by Interesting Times	6th Rincewind Story; Published in 1998	Succeeded by The Last Hero
