= Rincewind =

Character in Discworld novels by Terry Pratchett

- Discworld character
- Rincewind as illustrated by Paul Kidby in The Art of Discworld
- First appearance: The Colour of Magic (1983)
- Last appearance: The Science of Discworld IV: Judgement Day (2013)
- Created by: Terry Pratchett
- Portrayed by: David Jason
- Voiced by: Eric Idle (Discworld video game, 1995)

In-universe information
- Occupation: Wizard
- Affiliation: Unseen University

Rincewind (/ˈrɪns.wɪnd/ RINSE-winn'd) is a character who appears in several of the Discworld novels by Terry Pratchett. He was a failed student at Unseen University for wizards in Ankh-Morpork, described as "the magical equivalent to the number zero". He spent most of his time running away from people who wanted to kill him for various reasons. The reason that he was still alive and running was explained by noting that while he was born with a wizard's spirit, he had the body of a long-distance sprinter.

Rincewind was portrayed by David Jason in the film adaptation of The Colour of Magic. Pratchett said in an interview that he unwittingly took Rincewind's name from "Churm Rincewind", a fictitious person referred to in early "'Beachcomber" columns in the Daily Express.

== Appearances ==
In The Colour of Magic, Rincewind acted as a guide for the tourist Twoflower, who hailed from the Agatean Empire in the Counterweight Continent, across the disc from the 'hub' continent where Ankh-Morpork is situated. He was recruited for this because only he can communicate with Twoflower (they use Be-Trobi as a lingua franca), Twoflower agreed to pay him in rhinu (large gold coins), and because the Patrician of Ankh-Morpork wished to prevent an Agatean attack on Ankh-Morpork sparked by Twoflower's death. He and Twoflower wandered around for quite a while, and were chased by everything from the personification of Death to a Lovecraftian creature named Bel-Shamharoth.

Rincewind and Twoflower parted ways at the end of The Light Fantastic and Twoflower gave Rincewind his sapient-pearwood Luggage. Rincewind's adventures continued, and he was chased across various regions of the Discworld in spite of, or often driven by, his desire to find somewhere he can relish boredom in peace and quiet.

During the events of The Last Hero, in which the Discworld risks being destroyed if Cohen the Barbarian and his Silver Horde succeed in their plan to "return fire to the Gods with interest", Rincewind says he did not wish to volunteer for a dangerous mission. When asked to explain, he said he merely refused for appearances, because someone was bound to nominate him because of his knowledge of the geography of Cori Celesti or his friendship with Cohen, so even if he refused, somehow events would conspire against him and he would end up going on the mission anyway as he attempted to escape.

Raising Steam mentions Rincewind in footnotes, which refer to him as a professor at the university, studying the effects of different flowers on the nervous system.

=== In other media ===
Rincewind is the main character of the text adventure The Colour of Magic, based on the book. Rincewind is also the player character of the 1995 Discworld video game. After a dragon is spotted in Ankh-Morpork, Unseen University's archchancellor sends Rincewind to find the source of the trouble. In Discworld II: Missing Presumed...!?, Death disappears and the archchancellor puts Rincewind in charge of finding him and convincing him to get back to work. In both games, Rincewind is voiced by Eric Idle.

== Character ==
Rincewind has the ability to pick up the essentials of foreign languages quickly and fluency only slightly less quickly, and appears to have the ability to blend in to any situation. During The Colour of Magic, when he was projected into a universe that may or may not have been our own, he assumed the role of a nuclear physicist. In keeping with his nature, the role was as a physicist who specialized in the 'breakaway oxidation phenomena' of certain reactors—or, to put another way, what happens when those reactors caught fire (Terry Pratchett served as the press officer for several nuclear power plants before he became a full-time writer). Rincewind speculated on the nature of science, expressing hope in The Colour of Magic that there was something "better than magic" in the world, and speculated on the possibility of harnessing lightning, for which he was mocked by "sensible" Discworld citizens. Rincewind is also fairly streetwise. He is often depicted as a harsh critic of the selected stupidities surrounding him, even though he can't help but comply with whatever absurdity that arises. For example, in the computer games starring him, he consistently spotted the ludicrous events around him and would then make jokes and puns to the unaware participants. He also seems to display, despite his apparent failure as a wizard, a fairly extensive magical knowledge, recognizing various spells, magical artefacts and concepts throughout his escapades.

Some of Rincewind's talents once stemmed from a semi-sentient and highly destructive spell that had lodged itself inside his mind and scared off all other spells (mentioned in The Colour of Magic and The Light Fantastic; though even without the spell's interference he was still an extremely incompetent wizard). The spell occasionally tried to make itself heard when Rincewind was going through a stressful time; as he was falling to his near-death, he said the first seven out of eight words of the spell.

In Sourcery and Unseen Academicals Rincewind claims that he never knew his mother as she ran away before he was born.

Rincewind has received several titles during his stay at the Unseen University; some of them because nobody else wants them, others to keep him busy doing work unrelated to magic. These titles and their accompanying tenure include the condition that he cannot have any salary, influence, or opinions. They do, however, include meals, his laundry done, and (as a result of all the impressive-sounding but essentially meaningless titles that have been bestowed upon him) up to eight buckets of coal a day during the entire year.

== Concept and creation ==
Pratchett said that Rincewind's job is "to meet more interesting people", saying that there is not much he can do with a character who is a coward and does not care who knows it. Pratchett noted that one of his major problems was that he has a "lack of an inner monologue".

== The Luggage ==
The Luggage is a large chest that follows Rincewind literally wherever he goes—even onto Roundworld, which Rincewind initially only visited virtually. It is made of sapient pearwood, a magical, intelligent plant that is nearly extinct, impervious to magic, and only grows in a few places outside the Agatean Empire, generally on sites of very old magic. As such, whilst considered oddities on the Hubland continent, such chests were commonplace in the Agatean Empire. It can produce hundreds of little legs and move very fast if the need arises. It has been described as "half suitcase, half homicidal maniac". Interesting Times demonstrated that Luggages were capable of reproducing, which Twoflower suggested was chiefly the result of what the Luggage learnt in Ankh-Morpork.

Its function is to act as both a luggage carrier and bodyguard for its owner. The Luggage is fiercely defensive of its owner, and is generally homicidal in nature, killing or eating several people and monsters and destroying various ships, walls, doors, geographic features, and other obstacles throughout the series. Its mouth contains "lots of big square teeth, white as sycamore, and a pulsating tongue, red as mahogany". The inside area of The Luggage does not appear to be constrained by its external dimensions, and contains many conveniences: even after it has just devoured a monster, the next time it opens the owner will find his underwear, neatly pressed and smelling slightly of lavender. It is unknown exactly what happens to anyone it 'eats'.

One of the most notable features of The Luggage is its ability to follow its current owner anywhere, including places like inside its owner's mind, off the edge of the Disc, Death's Domain, inside the Octavo, the Dungeon Dimensions, and even (literally) to Hell and back. Like all luggage, it is constantly getting lost and having to track its owner down. It has only one way of overcoming obstacles, and that is to simply ignore them and smash a hole through them—including a wall to a magic shop that had since relocated to another city by magical means.

== Reception and legacy ==
In her review of Night Watch, A. S. Byatt noted the lack of appearances of Rincewind and the grimmer presentation of the witches and Ankh-Morpork as signs of Pratchett's imagination growing darker. While the current release (version 3.0.0) of VLC media player is named Vetinari, a previous release (version 2.1.0) was named Rincewind. Other releases of VLC media player have been named "The Luggage" (version 1.1.0), and release 2.0.0 was named "Twoflower", the character that gave The Luggage to Rincewind (in The Light Fantastic).

Rincewind and Discworld witch Nanny Ogg appeared on first-class Royal Mail stamps in March 2011. The issue included wizards, witches and enchanters from British fiction, and also included characters from the Arthurian Legend, from J. K. Rowling's Harry Potter series, and from the Narnia series of C. S. Lewis.

Paul Whitelaw, writing for The Scotsman, felt that David Jason was "clearly several decades too old" to be Rincewind in the film adaptation of The Colour of Magic. The Cretaceous gymnosperm species Phoenicopsis rincewindii is named after Rincewind.
