= Unseen University =

Fictional school from the Discworld series

- Motto: Nunc id Vides, Nunc ne Vides ("Now you see it, Now you don't.")
- Type: Public
- Established: 1282 AM (current Ankh-Morpork calendar dates from founding)
- Dean: Henry
- Archchancellor: Mustrum Ridcully
- Location: Ankh-Morpork, Ankh-Morpork, Ankh-Morpork
- Campus: Urban
- Colours: Burgundy and midnight blue, with yellow and purple stripes (octarine)
- Website: Unseen University

The Unseen University (UU) is a school of wizardry in Terry Pratchett's Discworld series of fantasy novels. Located in the fictional city of Ankh-Morpork, the UU is staffed by mostly indolent and inept old wizards. The university's name is a pun on the Invisible College, and many aspects of the university are references to Oxford and Cambridge University. The exploits of the head wizards of the Unseen University are a major component in many of the story lines in the books, playing a central role in 13 novels of the main series, as well as the four supplementary The Science of Discworld books and the short story, A Collegiate Casting-Out of Devilish Devices.

== Staff ==
The staff usually come in a group in the books in which they appear, though Rincewind initially followed his own storyline, only being a part of the group in the Science of Discworld books and Unseen Academicals, and the Librarian makes solo appearances in several books. Ridcully and Ponder also appeared in Going Postal and Night Watch. Ridcully alone appears in Thud!. The wizards are referred to by their offices (e.g. "Lecturer in Recent Runes"), rather than names. There is a slight reference to this in The Last Continent, when the wizards notice that they not only don't know the Librarian's name, but they also don't know the names of one another. In Unseen Academicals, Ridcully has difficulty remembering the Dean's name, despite having started at UU around the same time.

=== Archchancellor ===
Mustrum Ridcully illustrated by Paul Kidby

The head of Unseen University is the Archchancellor, an important figure who holds a seat on the Ankh-Morpork council and acts as a magical adviser to the Patrician.

The Archchancellor of UU is considered the leader of all wizards on the Disc (by those at the UU), the first among equals (i.e. other eighth-level wizards). Unseen University has existed for thousands of years; the average Archchancellor remains in office for about eleven months. There are eight eighth-level wizards and the number becomes progressively higher as the level decreases. It is common to ascend through the ranks by assassinating superiors. This has been known as the tradition of "dead man's pointy shoes."

Mustrum Ridcully (Ridcully the Brown) becomes the Archchancellor of Unseen University in the tenth Discworld novel Moving Pictures, and holds it for the rest of the series. Unlike recent holders, Ridcully enjoys an injury-free term as Archchancellor, by bringing a halt to the traditional method of promotion simply by being indestructible. This is related to his habit of springing up behind would-be assassins, shouting loudly at them and banging their head repeatedly in the door. He is also known as Ridcully the Brown, as he is from the country and has an affinity for small animals similar to that of 'Radagast the Brown', but in Ridcully's place it's how he can hunt them.

Ridcully's brother is Hughnon Ridcully, High Priest of Blind Io and Ankh-Morpork's religious spokesman. Lords and Ladies reveals that he and Esme Weatherwax were in a relationship some fifty years before Ridcully became Archchancellor, but their career paths had kept them apart. He continued to love Esme throughout his life, and in The Shepherd's Crown he weeps while mourning her death.

In the Cosgrove Hall animation of Soul Music, Ridcully is voiced by Graham Crowden. In 2006's two-part adaptation of Hogfather, he is portrayed by Joss Ackland. In the 2010 adaptation of Going Postal, he is portrayed by Timothy West.

=== Bursar ===
Professor A.A. Dinwiddie, DM (7th), D.Thau., B.Occ., M.Coll. first appears in the ninth Discworld novel ~~Faust~~ Eric as a quiet, reserved person. He took the post of university treasurer because of his affinity for numbers.

The previous Bursar, Spelter, was killed trying to save the library from destruction in Sourcery. Dinwiddie expected a relatively safe office to hold since nobody else actually wanted to be bursar and dreamed of spending the rest of his life quietly adding up rows of figures. Unfortunately, shortly after he became Bursar, Mustrum Ridcully became Archchancellor. Ridcully's personality wore away at the Bursar, whose idea of excitement is a soft-boiled egg. During Moving Pictures, the Bursar leads Unseen University's investigation of the Holy Wood influence and the resultant "clicks" industry, partnering with Ridcully as all other members of the faculty are interested in the new spectacle. With Ridcully's personality having caused the Bursar's sanity to slowly evaporate, the Bursar is almost completely insane by the events of Reaper Man. Bursar is kept barely functional by experimental dried frog pills, whose effects are erratic.

In The Truth, the Bursar (whose name is revealed to be Professor A.A. Dinwiddie) is tasked with discussing with Gunilla Goodmountain a contract for printing stationery for Unseen University despite past objections of wizardry over the magical hazards of moveable type, seeming quite sane when in his element. In Unseen Academicals, Ponder Stibbons (effectively the right hand of Ridcully) mentions that he has taken on the Bursar's responsibilities due to him "regard[ing] the decimal point as a nuisance".

=== The Dean ===
The Dean of Pentacles is a senior wizard, archetypally argumentative and lazy. He is generally found in his study reading a grimoire or more likely, in the great hall, eating. The Dean is particularly susceptible to occult or semi-magical occurrences, fads, or trends. However when the occasion arises, he can be among the more enthusiastic and competent of his peers; being a part-time Watch Special Constable – on the proviso that he not use magic in the course of his duties.

The Dean and Archchancellor Ridcully have been friends since their first days at the university. By the time of Unseen Academicals, the Dean becomes the first person to voluntarily resign from the university in memory; to become Archchancellor Henry of Brazeneck College of Pseudopolis. Ridcully regards this as traitorous despite their long friendship. On the Dean's first return visit to UU, Ridcully cannot decide how to address him and eventually remembers his fore-name is Henry. By the end of the novel, Ridcully is comfortable enough with The Dean's presence to refer to him as 'Dean', which Henry ignores.

=== Librarian ===
The Librarian

The Librarian first appears in the second novel of the series, The Light Fantastic, where he is transformed into an orang-utan following a magical accident. On discovering that being an orang-utan had certain advantages for a librarian, such as being able to reach high shelves, the Librarian refused to be transformed back into a human.

The Librarian is known for his violent reaction to most people calling him a "monkey", as he is technically an ape. He primarily uses the word Ook, inflected for simple affirmations and negations, though he occasionally uses Eeek in moments of panic or rage. Most people seem able to understand him.

As with other members of the UU faculty, the Librarian is referred to by his office and not by a name. If his name were known, he could be changed back into a human, and by the time of The Last Continent novel, he has carefully excised his name from the records of the Unseen University. The Discworld Companion hints and The Art of Discworld confirms that the Librarian was Dr Horace Worblehat, and that his fears of turning back into human are baseless at most. Rincewind is apparently the only wizard who still remembers the Librarian's name, but has agreed not to tell anyone, and no one else talks about it. The wizards are so accustomed to the Librarian that "if someone ever reported that there was an orang-utan in the Library, the wizards would probably go and ask the Librarian if he'd seen it."

The Librarian serves a brief stint in the City Watch during the reign of terror caused by the dragon. He retains an honorary position with the Watch and in Thud! is considered one of the first members of the 'Specials', the Ankh-Morpork City Militia. In Soul Music, he joins the Band with Rocks In and his large hands and wide reach make him an excellent keyboard player. He remains the chief organist for Unseen University. The Librarian is also a member of a small elite group of senior Librarians of Time and Space who have the knowledge and ability to travel through L-Space, an extra-dimensional space that connects all libraries and other large accumulations of books.

The Librarian appears in orangutan form in the video games Discworld and Discworld II. In the 2008 TV adaptation of The Colour of Magic and The Light Fantastic by Sky One, he appears in both human and orang-utan form. His human form is portrayed by Nicolas Tennant.

=== Ponder Stibbons ===
Ponder Stibbons holds positions including Praelector, Reader in Invisible Writings, Master of Traditions, Camerlengo of Unseen University, keeper of Hex, and assistant to Archchancellor Ridcully. In these roles, he manages the administration and operations of the university.

Stibbons entered the University by passing the exam paper meant for fellow student Victor Tugelbend, which consisted solely of the question "What is your name?". He became the head of the students whose experiments with High-Energy Magic would lead to the creation of Hex, and eventually a member of the Faculty, where senior members generally treat him as the odd-job man.

In The Science of Discworld, Stibbons led the project to "split the thaum" (the magical equivalent of the atom). It is revealed in Unseen Academicals that, due to the number of positions he holds, Stibbons has accumulated sufficient votes to technically control the University Council. In addition, Stibbons mentions that he is also responsible for the University's finances as The Bursar "regards the decimal point as a nuisance".

The New Discworld Companion states:

"originally rather lazy by nature, he seems to have blossomed to become the youngest and most depressingly keen member of the faculty ... as one of the few wizards at the University with his head screwed on in any fashion, he appears, quite against his will, to be in the front line."

In Terry Pratchett's Hogfather, the film adaptation of the book of the same name, he is portrayed by Ed Coleman.

Stibbons appears in the video game Discworld II. He is characterised differently than in the books, evidenced by his erratic speech patterns and verbal tics, as well as his denials that he is being adversely affected by working on Hex.

=== Rincewind ===
Rincewind holds the Chair of Experimental Serendipity, the Chair for the Public Misunderstanding of Magic, and the positions of Professor of Virtual Anthropology, Egregious Professor of Cruel and Unusual Geography, Reader in Slood Dynamics, Fretwork Teacher, Lecturer in Approximate Accuracy, and Health and Safety Officer. These apparently unwanted positions were awarded to Rincewind provided that he does not receive any salary. Prior to receiving these titles, Rincewind held the post of Assistant Librarian, but it is unclear whether or not he retains the office. Rincewind is often concerned with his life, as many people all across Discworld have attempted to take it.

In the film version of The Colour of Magic, Rincewind is portrayed by David Jason.

=== Doctor Hix ===
Dr John Hix – 'Hicks with an X' in Unseen Academicals, after changing his name from Hicks because it did not suit his position. Hix is a necromancer. Since necromancy is officially banned in Ankh-Morpork, he is instead the Head of the Department of Postmortem Communications (although he acknowledges this is just a fancy way of saying necromancy). Hix has one member of staff, a reanimated skeleton called Charlie. He previously had another member of staff, the late Professor Flead, but Hix bound him to a club at the end of Making Money.

Hix frequently misbehaves, performs evil deeds and makes comments in bad taste as he is required to under university statute, a fact which the other members of UU grudgingly accept. He uses the phrase "Skull ring, remember?" as an excuse for his misbehavior, much like the Patrician's use of the phrase, "Tyrant, remember?".

=== Hex ===
Hex is a continually growing, magic-powered, self-building computer featuring ants and cheese as part of his architecture, and is housed in the basement of the High Energy Magic Building at the university. He is the UU's first mainframe computer, though instead of RAM, is powered by a waterwheel inside a ram skull, and its mouse is an actual mouse. Hex's "brain" consists of a series of glass tubes filled with ants, which form his processor, and a beehive in a back room, which constitutes the hard drive. Initially just a computer, helping with complicated calculations for spells and controlling the operations of complicated magical instruments, Hex has gradually developed more of a personality over the course of the series, being cranky, recalcitrant, demanding more cheese and believing in the Hogfather.

Hex has his origins in a device that briefly appears in Soul Music, created by Ponder Stibbons and some student Wizards in the High Energy Magic building. In this form it was simply a complex network of glass tubes, containing "ants as carriers of information". The wizards could then use punched cards to control which tubes the ants can crawl through, enabling it to perform simple mathematical functions.

=== Past archchancellors ===
- Alberto Malich, the first archchancellor and founder of UU. He went to the land of Death when he performed the Rite of AshkEnte backwards, and remained in Death's Domain as Death's assistant and butler. He also appeared in Mort, Soul Music, and in Hogfather where he appeared as Pixie Albert to Death's Hogfather. In the film version of Hogfather he is portrayed by David Jason.
- Chancellor Galder Weatherwax, a distant cousin of Granny Weatherwax, is chancellor for the first half of The Light Fantastic. He is the 304th Chancellor of the university. In the film version of The Colour of Magic, Weatherwax is portrayed by James Cosmo.
- Archchancellor Ymper Trymon is archchancellor for the second half of The Light Fantastic. In the film version of The Colour of Magic. Trymon is portrayed by Tim Curry.
- Coin the Sourcerer is the archchancellor during Sourcery.

Others include Cutangle (Equal Rites), Virrid Wayzygoose (Sourcery), Ezrolith Churn (Eric), Sloman, who discovered the Special Theory of Slood, and Preserved Bigger (Unseen Academicals).

=== Past students ===
- Eskarina Smith, known as Esk, is the main character in Equal Rites, and was the Unseen University's first and only known female graduate. She did not appear again in the series until I Shall Wear Midnight, in which she was described as being both old and young due to her mastery of time travel. She becomes a close friend of the adult Tiffany Aching. Esk is mentioned briefly again in The Shepherd's Crown with an (unnamed) son.
- Victor Tugelbend is the main character of Moving Pictures. Renowned for being exceptionally lazy, he sought to continue life as a student wizard by studying hard enough to score 84 in his exams, four points below the passing grade of 88 but four more required to continue receiving a legacy from his late uncle. Enticed by Holy Wood dreams, Victor dropped out of Unseen University (before exams rigged so that he could receive only a score of either 0 or 100) and became a 'click' actor, working under the name Victor Maraschino. He investigates the Holy Wood influence and helps to save the Disc from creatures from the Dungeon Dimensions. He was the one-time dorm-mate of Ponder Stibbons, who passed his exams after being allowed to use the absent Victor's paper.
- Adrian Turnipseed (appears in Soul Music, The Last Continent, Hogfather and others). In Unseen Academicals, Adrian Turnipseed was working for Braseneck College.
- Mr Sideney, a member of Teatime's gang. In the film adaptation of Hogfather, the character is portrayed by Nigel Planer.

=== Past wizards ===
- Drum Billet, a wizard appearing in Equal Rites, later reincarnated as an ant living under Unseen University.
- Windle Poons, a very old wizard, first appearing in Moving Pictures. He died at the age of 130, before returning briefly as a zombie.

== See also ==
- Ankh-Morpork
- Ankh-Morpork City Watch
- List of Discworld characters
- Witches (Discworld)
