= Once More* with Footnotes =

2004 anthology by Terry Pratchett

- Cover artist: Omar Rayyan
- Publisher: NESFA Press
- Publication date: 2004
- ISBN: 1-886778-57-4

Once More* With Footnotes is a book by Terry Pratchett, published by NESFA Press in 2004 when he was the guest of honor for Noreascon Four, the 62nd World Science Fiction Convention. It contains a mixture of short stories, articles, introductions to other books, and speeches, including his first published short story, "The Hades Business".

The initial run is a limited edition hardback, consisting of 2,500 copies. It had two additional printings in hardback and is currently out of print. The book has a notable discrepancy: the front cover gives the title with two asterisks (the result of the cover design.) The title page has no asterisks, the press release and the Publisher's product page have one asterisk.

The title is a reference to the phrase "once more, with feeling" and to Pratchett's frequent use of footnotes in his Discworld series, along with the brief author commentary at the start of each piece; the book itself actually contains very few footnotes. One of NESFA's working titles for the book was "Oh Bugger, by Wossname".

All works contained within 'Once More* With Footnotes' were later published in two collections, A Blink of the Screen (2012), a collection of short fiction, and A Slip of the Keyboard (2014), a collection of non-fiction.

== Contents ==
- Terry Pratchett: The Man, The Myth, The Legend, The Beverage (Introduction by Esther Friesner)
- Apology (Introduction by Terry Pratchett)
- "Hollywood Chickens" (story)
- Doctor Who? (speech transcript)
- "The Hades Business" (story)
- The Big Store (article)
- 20p with Envelope and Seasonal Greeting (story)
- Paperback Writer (article)
- "Incubust" (story)
- "Final Reward" (story)
- And Mind the Monoliths (article)
- "FTB" (story)
- "Theatre of Cruelty" (story)
- Intro to: The Unseen University Challenge
- 2001: The Vision and the Reality (article)
- High Tech, Why Tech? (article)
- Roots of Fantasy (article)
- Intro to: The Wyrdest Link
- Thought Progress (article)
- "The Sea and Little Fishes" (story)
- Intro to: The Leaky Establishment by David Langford
- Let There be Dragons (article)
- #ifdefDEBUG + "world/enough" + "time" (story)
- Foreword to: Brewer's Dictionary of Phrase and Fable [16th edition]
- Thud— A Historical Perspective (story, sort of)
- "Death and What Comes Next" (story)
- Neil Gaiman: Amazing Master Conjurer (article)
- Intro to: The Ultimate Encyclopedia of Fantasy
- Elves Were Bastards (article)
- Medical Notes (story, sort of)
- Sheer Delight: Tribute to Bob Shaw (article)
- The Orangutans are Dying (article)
- The Ankh-Morpork National Anthem (story, sort of)
- Alien Christmas (speech transcript)
- "Turntables of the Night" (story)
- Cult Classic (article)
- The Choice Word (article)
- Whose Fantasy Are You? (article)
- No Worries (article)
- "Troll Bridge" (story)
- The Faces of Fantasy / On Writing (article)
- Imaginary Worlds, Real Stories (speech transcript)
- Secret Book of the Dead (poem)
- Magic Kingdoms (article)
- "Once and Future" (story)
- A Word About Hats (article)
- The Titles That Got Away (Afterword by Priscilla Olson)
