= Discworld Diary =

Themed diaries by Terry Pratchett

Cover of the 2000 Discworld diary

The Discworld Diaries are a series of themed diaries based on the Discworld novels by Terry Pratchett. Each one (except the 2008 diary) is based on an Ankh-Morpork institution, and has an opening section containing information about that institution written by Pratchett and Stephen Briggs.

The diaries feature a great deal of background information, far more than could reasonably be put into the novels. However, some of this occasionally finds its way into the series proper - the concept of female assassins, the introduction of Black Widow House, and the characters of Miss Alice Band and Mme les Deux-Épées were notable ideas that first appeared in the Assassins' Guild Yearbook, and later in the Discworld short story "Minutes of the Meeting to Form the Proposed Ankh-Morpork Federation of Scouts" in A Blink of the Screen, to then becoming characters and a playable Assassins' Guild House in Discworld MUD.

The early diaries are illustrated by Paul Kidby.

Those for 2015 and 2016 were by Pratchett aided and abetted by the Discworld Emporium, with additional illustrations by Peter Dennis

The diaries are:

- Discworld's Unseen University Diary 1998 (1997); the cover art features the character Death, possibly the character who appeared in the greatest number of Discworld novels.
- Discworld's Ankh-Morpork City Watch Diary 1999 (1998); the cover art features the character Commander Samuel Vimes of the Watch, His Grace the Duke of Ankh, in his beloved street uniform, in other words, battered Watchman armor.
- Discworld Assassins' Guild Yearbook and Diary 2000 (1999); the cover art features the character Lord Downey, the Assassins' Guild leader, with his specialty peppermint (rumored poisoned).
- Discworld Fools' Guild Yearbook and Diary 2001 (2000); the cover art features Dr Whiteface, the Fools' Guild leader, bursting through a paper hoop.
- Discworld Thieves' Guild Yearbook and Diary 2002 (2001); the cover art features a "photofit" of Mr Boggis, the Thieves' Guild leader.
- Discworld (Reformed) Vampyre's Diary 2003 (2002); the cover art features Mr John Not-A-Vampire-At-All Smith, head of the Ankh-Morpork Mission of the Black Ribboners with a cup of steaming brown liquid, likely coffee or hot cocoa.
- Ankh-Morpork Post Office Handbook Diary 2007 (2006); the cover art features Moist von Lipwig, the Postmaster of the Ankh-Morpork Post Office, wearing his token golden suit and wingèd hat, with Lipwigzers on either side of him.
- Lu Tze's Yearbook of Enlightenment 2008 (2007); the cover art features Lu-Tze in the lotus position, with his broom in front of him, against a square with the phrase "It won't get better if you pick it" (from the Way of Mrs Cosmopolite).
- 2015 Discworld Diary. First & Last Aid. We R Igors (2014); cover art features Igor.
- 2016 Discworld Diary: A Practical Manual for the Modern Witch (2015); the cover art depicts Nanny Ogg and Granny Weatherwax drawn by Peter Dennis
- The Terry Pratchett Diary. Terry Pratchett & Friends (2016), aided & abetted by the Discworld Emporium. Illustrations by Peter Dennis. Introduction by Rhianna Pratchett and contributions by Neil Gaiman, Dr Pat Harkin, A.S.Byatt, Professor David Lloyd, Roger Peyton, Colin Smythe, Bernard Pearson, Paul Kidby, Stephen Baxter, Sandra Kidby, Amy Anderson, Jennifer Brehl, Philippa Dickinson, Maddy Prior, Ian Stewart, Malcolm Edwards, Stephen Briggs and Rob Wilkins. Only the dates are given, not the days of the week, so it is suitable for use in any year.
- The Ankh-Morpork Archives Vol. 1 (2019) and Vol. 2 (2020); anthologies of material written for the Discworld Diaries.

There were no diaries published for the years 2004-2006, and 2009-2015; The Discworld Almanak by Pratchett and Bernard Pearson was published in 2004.

Due to their limited edition nature, Discworld Diaries become increasingly valuable as they grow older. As of 2016, the 1998 Discworld's Unseen University Diary was available for around £90.
