= Men at Arms =

1993 Discworld novel by Terry Pratchett

- First edition
- Author: Terry Pratchett
- Cover artist: Josh Kirby
- Language: English
- Series: Discworld; 15th novel – 2nd City Watch novel (3rd story)
- Subject: Affirmative action, firearms, and crime novels; Characters: The City Watch, Havelock Vetinari; Locations: Ankh-Morpork
- Genre: Fantasy
- Publisher: Victor Gollancz Ltd
- Publication date: 1993
- ISBN: 0-575-05503-0
- Preceded by: Lords and Ladies
- Followed by: Soul Music

Men at Arms is a fantasy novel by British writer Terry Pratchett, the 15th book in the Discworld series, first published in 1993. It is the second novel about the Ankh-Morpork City Watch. City Watch characters Angua, Detritus (though he had already appeared in Moving Pictures as a side-character) and Cuddy are introduced in this book.

== Plot ==
Edward d'Eath, who is from a down-and-out noble family, becomes convinced that the restoration of the Ankh-Morpork monarchy will solve the city's problems. He discovers evidence proving that Corporal Carrot is the rightful heir to the long-vacant throne. Meanwhile, Samuel Vimes, captain of the Ankh-Morpork City Watch, is preparing to retire and marry Sybil Ramkin, the richest woman in the city. At the same time, Lord Vetinari, the city's ruler, orders the Watch to hire its first non-human recruits under the pretext of promoting diversity. Besides Carrot, the remaining Watch members Sergeant Colon and Corporal Nobbs take charge of training these new officers, comprising Cuddy (a dwarf), Detritus (a troll), and Angua, a woman who is a werewolf but tries to keep it a secret.

d'Eath steals "the Gonne", the Discworld's first and only firearm, from the Assassins' Guild. Any possessor of the Gonne seems to become obsessed with the device and its power. d'Eath ends up committing a string of seemingly random murders, including among the other guilds, with the intention of discrediting Vetinari's rule. This stirs up racial tensions and eventually starts a riot. After d'Eath reveals his plan to Dr. Cruces, head of the Assassins' Guild, Cruces murders him and takes up the plan himself. Even though Vetinari forbids Vimes to look into the murders, he uses reverse psychology, knowing Vimes's stubborn nature. Cuddy and Detritus are forced to work together, resulting in them becoming friends as they overcome their deep-seated racial enmity. Angua is helped by the talking dog Gaspode. She also forms a romantic connection with Carrot, who handles the discovery that she is a werewolf poorly.

The Watch eventually discover and prevent Cruces from killing Vetinari at Vimes's wedding, but Cuddy and Angua are killed in the process. Devastated by the losses, Vimes and Carrot confront and disarm Cruces. Carrot helps Vimes resist the Gonne's allure, but Cruces then regains possession of the weapon and is about to kill them. He shows Carrot the evidence proving that he is the heir, offering him his rightful claim to the throne. Carrot pretends to agree so Cruces remains distracted and kills him with his sword. Carrot then smashes the Gonne and has both the evidence and the mangled weapon hidden.

Due to her werewolf nature, Angua recovers from her wounds on the next moon's rising, reuniting with Carrot. Vimes and Ramkin are married. Carrot visits Vetinari, who is expecting Carrot to make personal demands as he is now in a strong position to blackmail him. Instead, Carrot requests Vetinari to implement a plan for reforming the City Watch into an effective police force with Vimes as Commander. Vetinari accepts and promotes Carrot to Captain. When asked about his view, he tells Vetinari that he prefers to serve rather than rule the city.

== Reception ==
Publishers Weekly considered it to not be "as consistently funny as Pratchett's earlier novels", but noted that "the dialogue is hilarious", and opined that although it lacked "rational narrative cause-and-effect", this "didn't matter"; similarly, Kirkus Reviews found it to be "an about average installment" of an "always entertaining, sometimes hysterically funny series."

Brandon Sanderson has described it as "funny in a clever, scholarly, satire sort of way", with "excellent pacing" and "irresistible" characters.

Reading order guide
Preceded by Lords and Ladies	15th Discworld Novel	Succeeded by Soul Music
Preceded by Theatre of Cruelty	3rd City Watch Story; Published in 1993	Succeeded by Feet of Clay
