= The Discworld Companion =

1994 book by Terry Pratchett

- Cover of the first edition
- Author: Terry Pratchett and Stephen Briggs
- Illustrator: Stephen Briggs
- Cover artist: Josh Kirby
- Language: English
- Series: Discworld
- Publisher: Gollancz
- Publication date: 1994
- Publication place: United Kingdom
- Media type: Print (Hardcover and Paperback)
- Pages: 288 pp
- ISBN: 0-575-05764-5

The Discworld Companion is an encyclopaedia of the Discworld fictional universe, created by Terry Pratchett and Stephen Briggs. Four editions have been published, under varying titles.

The Companion contains precise definitions of words, people, places and events that have appeared in at least one Discworld novel, map, diary or non-fiction book, or in one of the three short stories "Troll Bridge", "Theatre of Cruelty", and "The Sea and Little Fishes". Material is often quoted directly from these sources, but, in each successive edition, also includes information that had not yet been worked into the novels.

For instance, William de Worde is mentioned in the first edition of the Companion six years before the publication of The Truth, the novel in which he is introduced. At the end of each article is an abbreviation indicating the book(s) in which the word, person, event or place appears, though if there are too many, no abbreviation is used. The book includes an introduction by Stephen Briggs and an interview with Terry Pratchett, both of which have been updated in each edition.

== Publishing history ==
The first edition, published in 1994, contained information from all the novels up to Soul Music as well as the first two short stories. The second edition, published in 1997, added information up to Maskerade. The third edition was published in 2003 under the title The New Discworld Companion. It contains articles based on books up to Night Watch, as well as related books and short stories. The book also contains a ten-page interview with Pratchett under the heading "Discworld Quo Vadis?".

An updated edition of the Companion, published on 18 October 2012, was called Turtle Recall: The Discworld Companion ... So Far and included information from all the novels up to and including Snuff.

The latest edition of the Companion, "The Absolute Discworld Companion", was published on 11 November 2021 and is updated to include information from all forty-one Discworld novels. In 2022, Dunmanifestin Ltd published a deluxe hardcover version, the "Dunmanifestin Edition", which also includes additional information drawn from The Science of Discworld books.

== Publication history ==
- Pratchett, Terry; Stephen Briggs (1994). The Discworld Companion. London: Gollancz. ISBN 0-575-05764-5. Hardcover
- Pratchett, Terry; Stephen Briggs (1995). The Discworld Companion. London: Gollancz. ISBN 0-575-06002-6. trade paperback
- Pratchett, Terry; Stephen Briggs (1997). The Discworld Companion Updated. London: Gollancz. ISBN 0-575-60030-6. Paperback
- Pratchett, Terry; Stephen Briggs (2000). The Discworld Companion Updated. London: Gollancz. ISBN 0-575-60030-6. Paperback, US edition
- Pratchett, Terry; Stephen Briggs (2002). The New Discworld Companion. London: Gollancz. ISBN 0-575-07467-1. Trade paperback, 544 pp.
- Pratchett, Terry; Stephen Briggs (2003). The New Discworld Companion. London: Gollancz. ISBN 0-575-07467-1. Trade paperback, 280 pp. Omits "Where Am I?"
- Pratchett, Terry; Stephen Briggs (2003). The New Discworld Companion. London: Gollancz. ISBN 0-575-07555-4. Paperback, 472 pp.
- Pratchett, Terry; Stephen Briggs (2012). Turtle Recall: The Discworld Companion...So Far. London: Gollancz. ISBN 978-0-575-09118-4. Hardcover
- Pratchett, Terry; Stephen Briggs (2014). Turtle Recall: The Discworld Companion...So Far. HarperCollins. ISBN 978-0-06-229255-1. Hardcover, US edition, 464 pp.
- Pratchett, Terry; Stephen Briggs (2021). The Ultimate Discworld Companion. Gollancz. ISBN 978-1-47-322350-9. Hardcover, UK edition, 448 pp.
- Pratchett, Terry; Stephen Briggs (2021). The Ultimate Discworld Companion. Gollancz. ISBN 978-1-47-322351-6. Trade Paperback, UK edition, 448 pp.
