= International Discworld Convention =

Discworld Convention
- Status: Active
- Genre: Fantasy
- Location: United Kingdom
- Inaugurated: 1996
- Website: https://www.dwcon.org/

The International Discworld Convention, also known as DWCon, is a biennial science fiction convention held in the United Kingdom on even-numbered years. DWCon was first held in 1996 by members of the Usenet newsgroup alt.fan.pratchett.

The DWCon is a fan-run convention focussing on the Discworld novels and other works by Terry Pratchett. The programme has several events that appear each time such as the Gala Dinner, Maskerade (spelled in this manner due to Pratchett's novel of the same name), Charity Auction, Guest of Honour Interview, and "Terry's Bedtime Stories". The conventions regularly feature large attendee-run groups that have been known variously as Guilds and Sects. There are also smaller events such as interviews, games and competitions, guest klatches, and other activities.

== History ==
The convention has been held in the UK since 1996. The conventions have been held at various different hotels. A planned convention in 2000 (Titled 'MilleniCon Hand and Shrimp') had to be cancelled for financial reasons, but the conventions have been run every two years since.

While Sir Terry once made a point of attending every UK-based Discworld Convention (and many of the non-UK conventions) as guest of honour, the Convention announced on 1 July 2014 that he would be unable to attend in person for health reasons, but that he would appear in an on-camera Q&A session from his home instead.

#	Year	Dates	City	Title	Guest of Honour	Other Guests	Size
1st	1996	28–30 June	Manchester, UK	The Discworld Convention	Sir Terry Pratchett	Josh Kirby, Stephen Briggs	
2nd	1998	18-21 Sept	Liverpool, UK	The Second Discworld Convention	Sir Terry Pratchett		
3rd	2002	16–19 August	Hinckley, UK	Discworld Convention	Sir Terry Pratchett		
4th	2004	20–23 August	Hinckley, UK	Discworld Convention	Sir Terry Pratchett	Bernard Pearson	
5th	2006	18–21 August	Hinckley, UK		Sir Terry Pratchett	Bernard Pearson	
6th	2008	August	Birmingham, UK		Sir Terry Pratchett		
7th	2010	August	Birmingham, UK		Sir Terry Pratchett		
8th	2012	24–27 August	Birmingham, UK	The Eighnnnnnnn Discworld Convention	Sir Terry Pratchett	Colin Smythe, Ian Stewart, Jack Cohen, Rob Wilkins, Lionel Fanthorpe, Stephen Baxter, Bernard Pearson, Jaqueline Simpson, Stephen Briggs, Ian Mitchell	950
9th	2014	8–11 August	Manchester, UK	The Ankh-Morpork Grand Exhibition	The Black Hat "to represent Terry in absentia" (Sir Terry Pratchett attending by video link)	Rob Wilkins ("representing The Hat for the whole Convention"), Bernard Pearson, Colin Smythe, Stephen Briggs, Ian Mitchell, Reb Voyce, Jacqueline Simpson, Jack Cohen, Ian Stewart, Daniel Knight, Ben Aaronovitch	
10th	2016	26–29 August	Warwick, UK	The Band with Rocks In		Rob Wilkins, Bernard Pearson, Colin Smythe, Daniel Knight, Ian Mitchell, Ian Stewart, Jack Cohen, Jacqueline Simpson, Ray Friesen, Reb Voyce, Stephen Briggs, David Brashaw, Diane Duane, Peter Morwood, Mark Oshiro	
11th	2018	3–6 August	Kenilworth, Warwick, UK	Guards! Guards!		Rob Wilkins, Bernard Pearson, Colin Smythe, Ian Mitchell, Reb Voyce, Stephen Briggs	
12th	2022	19–22 August	Birmingham, UK	Lancre		Colin Smythe, Stephen Briggs, Ian Mitchell, Pat Harkin, Reb Voyce, Phil Masters, Ben Aaronovitch, Jodi Taylor, Marc Burrows	
13th	2024	2-6 August	Birmingham, UK	The Chalk		Brick-Morpork, Stephen Briggs, Marc Burrows, Diane Duane, Jan Harkin, Pat Harkin, Phil Masters, C.K. McDonnell, Joe McLaren, Peter Morwood, Colin Smythe, Ian Stewart, Jodi Taylor, The Truth Shall Make Ye Fret, Reel Rebels	
