= Guards! Guards! =

1989 Discworld novel by Terry Pratchett

- First edition
- Author: Terry Pratchett
- Cover artist: Josh Kirby
- Language: English
- Series: Discworld; 8th novel – 1st City Watch story
- Subject: Cop novels, Film Noir, show dog (dragon) breeding, nobility/monarchy, secret societies, The Hobbit, particularly Smaug; Characters: Samuel Vimes, Fred Colon, Nobby Nobbs, Carrot Ironfoundersson, Havelock Vetinari, Sybil Ramkin; Locations: Ankh-Morpork
- Genre: Fantasy
- Publisher: Gollancz
- Publication date: 1989
- Awards: Came 69th in the Big Read
- ISBN: 0-575-04606-6
- Preceded by: Pyramids
- Followed by: Eric

Guards! Guards! is a fantasy novel by British writer Terry Pratchett, the eighth in the Discworld series, first published in 1989. It is the first novel about the Ankh-Morpork City Watch. The first Discworld point-and-click adventure game borrowed heavily from the plot of Guards! Guards!

== Plot ==
A secret monastic order led by one calling himself the Supreme Grand Master, plots to overthrow the Patrician of Ankh-Morpork and install a puppet monarch under the control of the Order. They summon a dragon to terrorise the city and plan to have the puppet "slay" the dragon and claim to be the lost heir of the defunct royal house.

The Night Watch, which is generally seen as incompetent, comprising Captain Sam Vimes, Sergeant Colon and Corporal Nobbs starts to change with the arrival of idealistic new recruit Carrot Ironfoundersson, a human orphan raised by dwarfvish parents. When the Librarian of the Unseen University reports a book of magic stolen, Vimes links the theft to the dragon's appearances. The Watch's investigation makes the acquaintance of Lady Sybil Ramkin, who breeds small swamp dragons, and gives an underdeveloped dragon named Errol to the Watch as a pet.

At first, the plot works flawlessly. The Patrician is ousted in favour of the new king, but the banished dragon returns and makes itself king, demanding gold and virgin sacrifices (for it to eat), and prepares to wage war against Ankh-Morpork's neighbours for the further acquisition of its hoard. The dragon puts the Patrician's secretary Lupine Wonse as its mouthpiece against his will.

Vimes confronts Wonse, having figured out that he is the Supreme Grand Master, and responsible for the dragon's appearance. Wonse has the palace guards imprison Vimes in the same cell as the Patrician. Vimes escapes with the help of the Librarian and runs to rescue Sybil, chosen as the first sacrificed maiden. After the remaining Watch fail to kill the king through a 'million-to-one chance' arrowshot, Errol fights it, and knocks it from the sky. The assembled crowd closes in to kill it, and Sybil pleads for the dragon's life. Carrot arrests it, but Errol lets it escape with him. They find out that the dragon is in fact female, and the battle between them was a courtship ritual.

Vimes arrests Wonse, as he tries to summon another dragon, telling Carrot to "throw the book at him". Wonse falls to his death after the very literal Carrot hits him with a thrown copy of Laws and Ordinances of Ankh-Morpork.

The Patrician is reinstated as ruler of Ankh-Morpork, and offers the Watch anything they want as a reward. To everyone's surprise, they ask only for a modest pay raise, a new tea kettle, and a dartboard.

== Reception ==
Guards! Guards! received generally positive reviews from contemporary magazines. In a review in Vector, Ben Gribbin considered it to be the greatest Discworld novel released so far, and a particular improvement over the previous two Discworld books. The magazine Fear's review by Richard Eddy praised its plot and comedy. Janice M. Eisen reviewed the novel for Aboriginal Science Fiction, awarding 4 and a half stars, recommending it for its humor, which would appeal to those who both are and are not fans of "sword-and-sorcery fiction".

In a review for Interzone in 1990, John Clute wrote that the book's serious topics risked damaging the Discworld's comedic potential: "Pratchett writes with something like genius", and particularly faulted Lord Vetinari's monologue on the nature of evil (which Clute described as Realpolitik and Weltschmerz): although he conceded that the monologue had been skilfully written, he felt that it "has all the ring of another sphere of discourse" and "comes close to shattering the comic pulse of the Discworld".

NPR described Guards! Guards! as a "solid entryway" to the Discworld novels.

== Adaptations ==
The novel has been adapted as:

- a six-episode serial on BBC Radio 4 (23 November - 28 December 1992) dramatised by Michael Butt and starring John Wood (Vimes), Melvyn Hayes (Nobby), Robert Gwilym (Carrot), Crawford Logan (Vetinari), Helen Atkinson-Wood (Lady Ramkin), Brett Usher (Supreme Grand Master), and Martin Jarvis (narrator).
- a stage play for the amateur stage scripted by Stephen Briggs (1993) (script later published in book form 1997).
- a professional stage play scripted by Geoffrey Cush and starring Paul Darrow (1998).
- a "Big Comic" (Graphic novel) drawn by Graham Higgins and based on Briggs' script (2000).
- an audio play presented live at Dragon*Con in 2001, adapted by David Benedict and performed by the ARTC (Atlanta Radio Theatre Company). In appreciation, the ARTC made a donation to the Orangutan Foundation International.
- a video game loosely based on the plot of the book, with Rincewind substituted for Sam Vimes.
- a Board Game - officially launched at Titancon, Belfast 24 September 2011 by Backspindle Games (Designers: Leonard Boyd & David Brashaw) in conjunction with Z-Man Games, USA. The game includes 90 Discworld character illustrations drawn by Stephen Player and respective text quotes from over twenty Discworld novels.

Reading order guide
Preceded by Pyramids	8th Discworld Novel	Succeeded by ~~Faust~~ Eric
Preceded by None	1st City Watch Story; Published in 1989	Succeeded by Theatre of Cruelty
