= Clarecraft =

British fantasy figurine company

- Clarecraft logo
- Company type: Private
- Industry: Figurines
- Founded: 1980
- Founder: Bernard and Isobel Pearson
- Defunct: October 2005
- Headquarters: Suffolk, England
- Key people: Sally Couch and Trish Baker (Co-owners)
- Products: Figurines based on the Discworld series Various other fantasy figurines
- Revenue: N/A
- Number of employees: 29
- Website: N/A

Clarecraft was a company which produced fantasy figurines. The most popular series made by the company were the officially licensed series that were based on the Discworld novels by Terry Pratchett. The company was founded in 1980 by Bernard and Isobel Pearson, and acquired the rights to make Discworld figurines in 1990. In 1993, Sally Couch and Trish Baker purchased Clarecraft. It is one of the few large-scale vendors of Discworld merchandise, along with Stephen Briggs, Paul Kidby, and the Discworld Emporium.

On 4 August 2005 Clarecraft announced they would be shutting down at the end of October and would stop taking orders in mid-October.

== Discworld figurines ==
Clarecraft figurines are made from a variety of different materials, including pewter and ceramic, and vary widely in size. They range from statues of characters to replicas of objects from the novels to locations appearing in the novels, and some function as book ends, stamps, or containers as well as figurines. The designers at Clarecraft consulted with Terry Pratchett to ensure their figurines accurately reflect the novels.

Clarecraft figurines were available in stores throughout England as well as online through Collectors Gifts. Its figurines have become quite collectable, with discontinued items often selling for many times their original price on auction sites. Since their pieces were handmade in Britain rather than mass-produced like many figurines, each statue is different. The most expensive sale on record is that of an extremely rare piece sold on eBay in early 2005 to benefit the tsunami relief effort, which sold for £1600.

== Discworld Collector's Guild ==
Clarecraft also ran a large fan club called The Discworld Collectors' Guild, which hosted a large convention every other year which drew about 1000 people, including Terry Pratchett himself.
