= The Unseen University Cut Out Book =

2006 cut-out book by Alan Batley

The Unseen University Cut-Out Book is a cut-out book that allows a reader to construct a replica of Unseen University from Terry Pratchett's Discworld Series. It was published on 1 October 2006, and includes a foreword by Terry Pratchett.

(publ Doubleday)

== The model ==
The book consists of sheets of card printed with the various faces of the models that the adult reader can cut out and glue to make eight buildings, The Tower of Art at its center:

- The Tower Of Art
- The Great Hall
- The Observatory
- The High Energy Magic Building
- The Clock Tower
- Modo's Garden Shed
- The Library
- The Boathouse

The models were illustrated by illustrator and model maker Alan Batley, from the original Unseen University model by Discworld artist Bernard Pearson.

The book is a 166-page softcover book printed on full 8-1/2" x 11" cardstock. The cut-outs are highly detailed, with many > tabs to cut by X-acto knife prior to assembly; they are printed in color on one side only throughout pages 39–165, and detailed instructions are printed on both sides of pages 9 to 38 (37-38), also printed in color on card stock.

The actual papers used by Transworld Publishers are "natural, recyclable, products made from wood grown in sustainable forests." (from the copyright page).

== Reception ==
Literature scholar Anne Hiebert Alton called The Unseen University Cut Out Book "an amazingly detailed card-board model needing assembly, along the lines of the well-known paper model of the Globe Theatre."

== See also ==
Unseen University
