= Turntables of the Night =

1989 short story by Terry Pratchett

"Turntables of the Night" is a short story by Terry Pratchett.

It was written for Hidden Turnings, a 1989 anthology of short stories edited by Diana Wynne Jones. It was later republished in The Flying Sorcerers, an anthology of humorous short stories edited by Peter Haining, which used a Josh Kirby illustration for "Turntables of the Night" story as cover art. It can also be found in the later Pratchett collections Once More* with Footnotes and A Blink of the Screen.

The story is narrated by John, the friend of an avid record collector named Wayne, as he is being interviewed by police following an accident at a Halloween party in a church hall. Wayne and John ran an unsuccessful mobile disc jockey business, and were working at the party when they encountered Death, who needs someone with Wayne’s passion to look after his own collection.
