= Pyramids (novel) =

1989 Discworld novel by Terry Pratchett

- First edition
- Author: Terry Pratchett
- Cover artist: Josh Kirby
- Language: English
- Series: Discworld; 7th novel – 1st individual story
- Subject: School stories, Ancient Egypt and Egyptian mythology, Quantum physics; Characters: Pteppic, Dios; Locations: Djelibeybi, Assassins Guild, Ankh-Morpork
- Genre: Fantasy
- Publisher: Gollancz
- Publication date: 15 June 1989
- Awards: British Fantasy Award (Best Novel) 1989
- ISBN: 0-575-04463-2
- Preceded by: Wyrd Sisters
- Followed by: Guards! Guards!

Pyramids is a fantasy novel by British writer Terry Pratchett, published in 1989, the seventh book in his Discworld series. It won the BSFA Award for Best Novel in 1989.

== Plot summary ==
The main character of Pyramids is Teppic (short for Pteppicymon), the crown prince of the tiny kingdom of Djelibeybi (a pun on the candy Jelly Baby, meaning "Child of the Djel"), the Discworld counterpart to ancient Egypt. The kingdom, founded seven-thousand years ago and formerly a great empire which dominated the continent of Klatch, has been in debt and recession for generations due to the construction of pyramids for the burial of its pharaohs (primarily on prime agricultural land) and now occupies an area two miles wide along the 150-mile-long River Djel.

Young Teppic has been in training at the Assassins Guild in Ankh-Morpork for the past seven years, having been sent to bring in revenue for the kingdom. The day after passing his final exam by chance, he mystically senses that his father, Pteppicymon XXVII, has died and that he must return home. Being the first Djelibeybian king raised outside the kingdom leads to some interesting problems, as Dios, the high priest, is a stickler for tradition, and does not actually allow the pharaohs to rule the country.

When plans are being laid out for the old pharaoh's tomb, Teppic (now Pteppicymon XXVIII) mentions that his father did not wish to be buried in a pyramid; in reaction to Dios's rejection of this idea, Teppic ends up ordering the construction of a pyramid twice the size of the largest one previously built in Djelibeybi. Whilst the pyramid-building Ptaclusp dynasty work out how to build the pyramid within budget and on time (eventually taking advantage of the unfinished pyramid's premature temporal distortions), the late Pteppicymon XXVII spends his time observing the embalming of his mortal remains and taking an interest in the lives of his embalmers, Dil and Gurn.

After numerous adventures and misunderstandings, Teppic is forced to escape from the palace with a handmaiden named Ptraci, who was condemned to death for not wishing to die and serve the late pharaoh in the afterlife (effectively on Dios' orders since Teppic wished to pardon her). However, during the attempt, Dios discovers them and decrees that Teppic has killed the King (as the King is only recognised whilst wearing the Mask of the Sun and Dios reasons that Teppic's actions to save Ptraci would not be those of the King) and should be put to death. Meanwhile, the massive pyramid warps space-time so much that it "rotates" Djelibeybi out of alignment with the space/time of the rest of the Disc by ninety degrees.

After Teppic and Ptraci manage to escape Djelibeybi, they travel to Ephebe to consult with the philosophers there as to how to get back. Meanwhile, pandemonium takes hold in Djelibeybi, as the kingdom's multifarious gods (many of whom occupy the same roles, such as Supreme God, God of the Sun, or God of the Djel) descend upon the populace, and all of Djelibeybi's dead rulers come back to life. Also, the nations of Ephebe and Tsort prepare for war with one another, as Djelibeybi can no longer act as a buffer zone between the two.

Eventually, Teppic re-enters the Kingdom and attempts to destroy the Great Pyramid, with the help of all of his newly resurrected ancestors. They are confronted by Dios, who, it turns out, is as old as the kingdom itself and has advised every pharaoh throughout its history, using the time warping powers of the pyramids to prolong his life. Dios hates change and thinks Djelibeybi should stay the same. Teppic succeeds in destroying the Pyramid, returning Djelibeybi to the real world and sending Dios back through time (where he loses his memories and meets the original founder of the Kingdom, thereby restarting the cycle). Teppic then abdicates, allowing Ptraci (who turns out to be his half-sister) to rule. Ptraci immediately institutes much-needed changes, Teppic decides to travel the Disc, Death comes to ferry the former rulers of Djelibeybi to the afterlife, and Djelibeybi's former embalmers and pyramid-builders adjust to life without the pyramids.

== Characters ==
- Teppic (short for Pteppicymon XXVIII), who left the kingdom to train at the Assassin's Guild of Ankh-Morpork as a boy, thus regarding himself more as Morporkian than Djelibeybian
- Dios, the High Priest of Djelibeybi and chief minister
- Pteppicymon XXVII, the late king of Djelibeybi and Teppic's father
- Chidder, one of Teppic's classmates and son of an affluent smuggler
- Arthur Ludorum, one of Teppic's classmates and the son of Johan Ludorum, a famous assassin
- Cheesewright, one of Teppic's classmates
- Ptraci, a handmaiden of the late king and Teppic's half-sister
- Dil and Gurn, master and apprentice embalmers tasked with mummifying Pteppicymon XXVII
- Ptaclusp I, Ptaclusp IIa and Ptaclusp IIb, the pyramid-building dynasty tasked with the construction of the Great Pyramid

== Publication ==
Pyramids was the last novel Pratchett published a German version of through Heyne Verlag. He decided to stop working with them after they inserted an advertisement for soup into the text.

== Major themes ==
The novel portrays a "time polder", a bubble which comprises a particular slice of history and a particular bit of geography. In this "polder", history repeats itself through Dios, and critic Stefan Ekman argues that a central theme of the novel is the struggle breaking free from the "polder", of leaving one's background behind.

Reading order guide
Preceded by Wyrd Sisters	7th Discworld Novel	Succeeded by Guards! Guards!
Preceded by None	1st Individual Story; Published in 1989	Succeeded by Moving Pictures
