= Discworld =

Fantasy book series by Terry Pratchett

- Cover of the first edition of The Colour of Magic; art by Alan Smith
- Author: Terry Pratchett
- Cover artist: Josh Kirby (1983–2001); Paul Kidby (2001–2015)
- Country: United Kingdom
- Language: English
- Genre: Comic fantasy
- Publisher: Transworld Publishers; Doubleday; Random House
- Published: 1983–2015
- Media type: Print: Hardback, paperback
- No. of books: 41 novels (List of books)
- Website: discworld.com

Discworld is a collection of fantasy comedy novels, graphic novels, short stories, and associated works conceived and primarily written by the English author Terry Pratchett. They are united by their being set on the Discworld, a flat planet balanced on the backs of four elephants which in turn stand on the back of a giant turtle. The novel series consists of forty-one books, the first being The Colour of Magic, published in 1983, and the last The Shepherd's Crown, published posthumously in 2015. Pratchett also wrote eleven short stories related to the Discworld. The novels often satirise classic fantasy and science fiction, mythology, and folklore, and also include commentary on contemporary cultural, political and scientific issues.

The series has spawned a number of supplementary works, including four books on the science of Discworld, four maps of locations within it, and an encyclopedia. While Pratchett was involved with most of these, he often worked in collaboration with others including Stephen Briggs, Ian Stewart, Jack Cohen, and long-time series illustrators Josh Kirby and Paul Kidby. There is no intention to publish further novels following Pratchett's death, but supplementary works continue to be published and include Tiffany Aching's Guide to Being a Witch, by Pratchett's daughter Rhianna and Gabrielle Kent. In addition, Discworld novels have been adapted into computer games, board games, and for the theatre and television.

The Discworld books contributed significantly to Pratchett being the UK's best-selling author in the 1990s, and they regularly topped the Sunday Times bestsellers list. Discworld novels have also won awards such as the Prometheus Award and the Carnegie Medal. In the BBC's Big Read, four Discworld novels were in the top 100, and a total of fourteen in the top 200. More than 80 million Discworld books have been sold in 37 languages.

== Themes and motifs ==
The Discworld novels contain common themes and motifs that run through the series. Many of the novels parody fantasy tropes and various subgenres of fantasy, like fairy tales (notably Witches Abroad) or vampire tales (Carpe Jugulum). Analogies of real-world issues, such as religion (Small Gods), fundamentalism and inner city tension (Thud), business and politics (Making Money), racial prejudice and exploitation (Snuff) recur, as do aspects of culture and entertainment such as opera (Maskerade), rock music (Soul Music), cinema (Moving Pictures), and football (Unseen Academicals). Parodies of non-Discworld fiction also occur frequently, including Shakespeare, Beatrix Potter, the Dirty Harry films and other movies. Major historical events, especially battles, are sometimes the basis for both trivial and key events (Jingo, Eric, and Pyramids), as are trends in science, technology, pop culture and modern art (Moving Pictures, Men at Arms, Thud). There are also humanist themes in many Discworld novels, and a focus on critical thinking skills in the Witches and Tiffany Aching series.

== Storylines ==
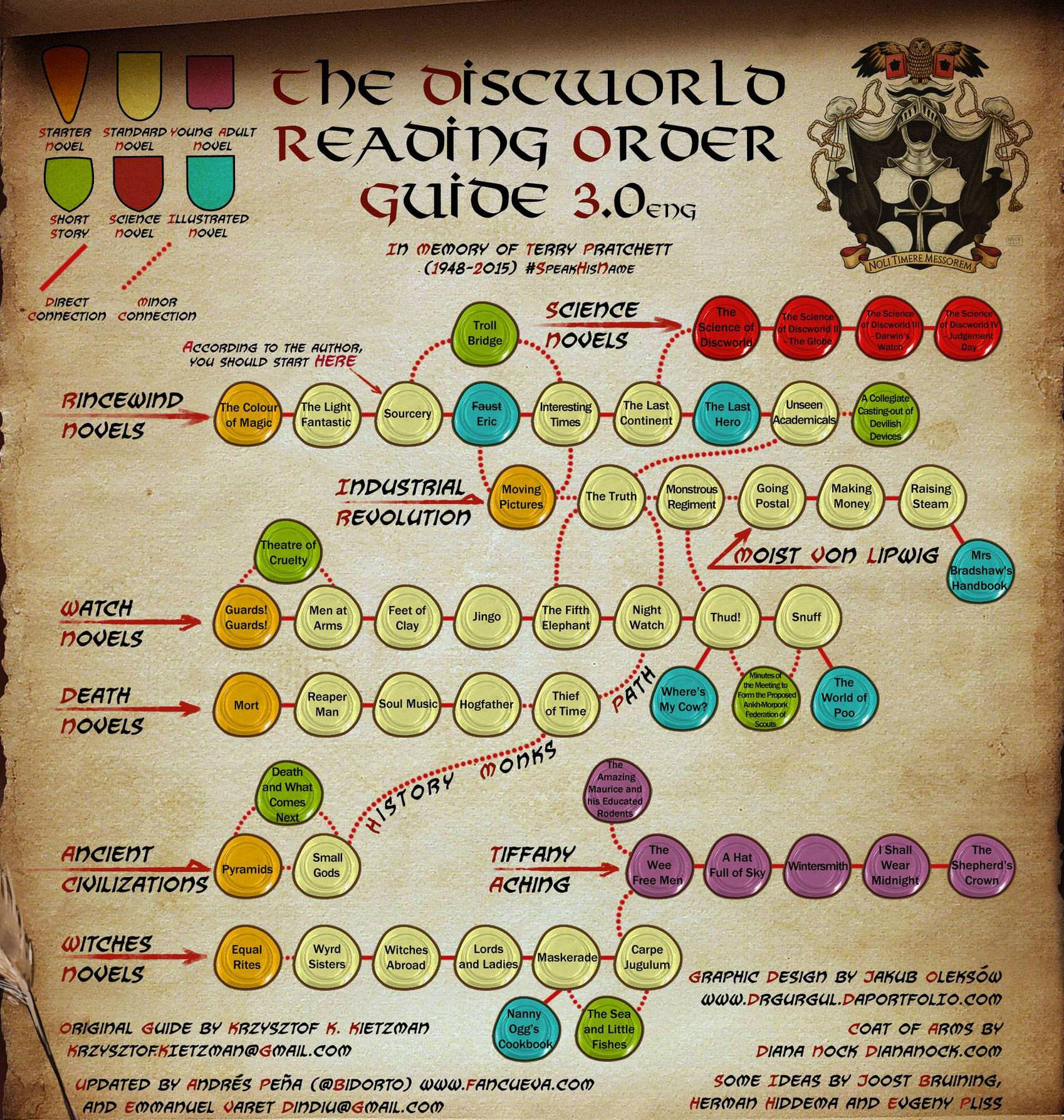
A fan-made reading order of the Discworld books that groups them by theme

The Discworld novels can be read chronologically, and were originally published as a continuous series. However, they are also grouped into sub-series of related novels which contain the same characters or themes. The editions published by Transworld from 2023 assign 30 of the novels to five sub-series, identified by a subtitle on the cover, which respectively group the novels about the Discworld's witches, its wizards, the Ankh-Morpork City Watch, and the characters Death and Tiffany Aching. The Discworld Emporium organises all of the novels except The Last Hero into seven sub-series, focused respectively on the Discworld's witches, gods, and industrial revolution, the Ankh-Morpork City Watch, the wizards of Unseen University, the character Death, and novels aimed at younger readers.

=== Rincewind ===
Rincewind was the first protagonist of Discworld. He is a wizard with no skill, no wizardly qualifications, and no interest in heroics. However, his lack of most magical abilities alongside the development of particular magical talents are partially due to a fundamental magical spell lodging itself in his mind and scaring all the other spells away. He is extremely cowardly but is constantly thrust into dangerous adventures. He saves Discworld on several occasions, and has an instrumental role in the emergence of life on Roundworld (Science of Discworld).

Other characters in the Rincewind story arc include Cohen the Barbarian, an aging hero of the old fantasy tradition, out of touch with the modern world and still fighting despite his advanced age; Twoflower, a naive tourist from the Agatean Empire (inspired by cultures of East Asia, particularly Japan and China); and The Luggage, a magical, semi-sentient and aggressive multi-legged travelling accessory. Rincewind appears in eight Discworld novels as well as the four Science of Discworld supplementary books.

=== Death ===
Death, a seven-foot skeleton in a black robe who rides a pale horse named Binky, appears in every novel except The Wee Free Men and Snuff, although sometimes with only a few lines. His dialogue is always depicted in SMALL CAPS without quotation marks. Several characters have said that his voice seemed to reach their minds without making a sound.

Death guides souls from this world to the next. Over millennia he has developed a fascination with humanity to a point and feels protective of it. In the novel Mort, he adopted a human daughter and took on a human apprentice. Eventually the daughter and apprentice had a daughter, Susan Sto Helit, a primary character in Soul Music, Hogfather, and Thief of Time.

Characters that often appear with Death include his butler Albert, his granddaughter Susan Sto Helit, the Death of Rats in charge of gathering the souls of rodents, Quoth the raven, and the Auditors of Reality, the closest thing Death has to a nemesis.

Five Discworld novels feature prominently either Death or Susan with Death appearing. He also appears in the short stories Death and What Comes Next, Theatre of Cruelty and Turntables of the Night.

=== Witches ===
Witches in Pratchett's universe act as herbalists, nurses, adjudicators and wise women who can use magic but generally prefer not to, finding simple but cunningly applied psychology (called "headology") far more effective.

The principal witch, Granny Weatherwax, a taciturn, bitter old crone from the small mountain country of Lancre, largely despises people but acts as their healer and protector because no one else can do this as well as she can. Her closest friend is Nanny Ogg, a jolly, personable witch with the "common touch" who enjoys a smoke and a pint of beer, and often sings bawdy folk songs like the notorious "Hedgehog Song". The two take on apprentice witches: first Magrat Garlick, then Agnes Nitt, then Tiffany Aching, who become accomplished witches.

Other characters in the Witches series include:

- King Verence II of Lancre, a onetime Fool
- Jason Ogg, Nanny Ogg's eldest son, the local blacksmith
- Shawn Ogg, Nanny's youngest son who serves as his country's entire army and civil service
- Nanny's murderous cat Greebo.

The witches appear in many Discworld books, and are protagonists in seven. They also appear in the short story "The Sea and Little Fishes". Their stories frequently draw on ancient European folklore and fairy tales, and parody famous works of literature, particularly by Shakespeare.

=== City Watch ===
The stories featuring the Ankh-Morpork City Watch are urban fantasy, and frequently depict a traditional, magically run fantasy world coming into contact with modern technology. They revolve around the growth of the Ankh-Morpork City Watch from a hopeless gang of three to a fully-equipped and efficient police force. The stories are largely police procedurals, featuring crimes with heavy political or societal overtones.

The main character Sam Vimes is a haggard, cynical, working-class street copper. When introduced in Guards! Guards!, he is the alcoholic captain of the three-person Night Watch, which also includes the lazy, cowardly, and none-too-bright sergeant Fred Colon and Corporal Nobby Nobbs, a petty thief in his own right. Then Carrot Ironfoundersson, a 6-foot-6-inch (198 cm) dwarf-by-adoption, joins the Watch.

Other main characters include

- Angua, a werewolf,
- Detritus, a troll,
- Reg Shoe, a zombie and Dead Rights campaigner,
- Cuddy, a Dwarf in Men at Arms, and
- Golem Constable Dorfl.

Cheery Littlebottom, the Watch's forensics expert and one of the first openly female dwarfs, tried to rename herself "Cheri" without success. Constable Visit-the-infidel-with-explanatory-pamphlets appears in some novels, and Sam's wife, Lady Sybil Vimes (née Ramkin) is integral to certain storylines. Inspector A E Pessimal was recruited by Vimes as his adjutant after Havelock Vetinari, the Patrician of Ankh-Morpork, sent him as an auditor.

The City Watch feature in eight Discworld stories, and cameoed in a number of others, including Making Money, the children's book Where's My Cow?, and the short story "Theatre of Cruelty".

Pratchett stated on numerous occasions that the presence of the City Watch makes Ankh-Morpork stories "problematic", as stories set in the city that do not directly involve Vimes and the Watch often require a Watch presence to maintain the story—at which point, it becomes a Watch story by default.

=== Wizards ===
The Wizards of Unseen University (UU) appear prominently throughout many Discworld novels; the books that centre around them exclusively are The Science of the Discworld series and the novels Unseen Academicals and The Last Continent. In the early books, the faculty of UU changed frequently; promotion usually involved assassination. However, after the ascension of the bombastic Mustrum Ridcully to the position of Archchancellor, the hierarchy settled down and characters had the chance to develop. Earlier books featured the wizards in possible invasions of Discworld by creatures from the Dungeon Dimensions, Lovecraftian monsters that hungered for magic.

The wizards of UU employ the traditional "whizz-bang" type of magic seen in Dungeons & Dragons games, but also investigate the rules and structure of magic in terms highly reminiscent of particle physics.

Prominent members include

- Ponder Stibbons, a geeky young wizard,
- Hex, the Disc's first computer/semi-sentient thinking engine,
- the Librarian, turned into an orangutan by magical accident, who refuses to be turned back,
- the Dean,
- the mentally unstable Bursar,
- the Chair of Indefinite Studies,
- the Lecturer in Recent Runes, and
- the Senior Wrangler.

In later novels, Rincewind joins their group, while the Dean leaves to become the Archchancellor of Brazeneck College in the nearby city of Pseudopolis.

The Wizards feature prominently in nine Discworld books and star in The Science of Discworld series and the short story "A Collegiate Casting-Out of Devilish Devices".

=== Tiffany Aching ===
Tiffany Aching is a young apprentice witch in a series of Discworld books aimed at young adults. Her stories often parallel mythic heroes' quests, but also deal with Tiffany's difficulties as a young girl maturing into a responsible woman. She is aided in her task by the Nac Mac Feegle, a gang of blue-tattooed, 6-inch-tall (15 cm), hard-drinking, loud-mouthed picts, also called "The Wee Free Men", who serve as her guardians. She is the protagonist of five novels, The Wee Free Men, A Hat Full of Sky, Wintersmith, I Shall Wear Midnight, and The Shepherd's Crown. Major characters in this series include Miss Tick, a travelling witch who discovers Tiffany; Nac Mac Feegle chieftain Rob Anybody; and the other young witches Annagramma Hawkin and Petulia Gristle. Both Granny Weatherwax and Nanny Ogg also appear in her stories.

=== Moist von Lipwig ===
Moist von Lipwig is a professional criminal and con man to whom Havelock Vetinari gives a "second chance" after staging his execution, recognising the advantages his jack-of-all-trades abilities will give to the development of the city. After putting him in charge of the Ankh-Morpork Post Office in Going Postal, with good results, Vetinari orders him to clear up the city's corrupt financial sector in Making Money. In a third book, Raising Steam, Vetinari directs Lipwig to oversee the development of a railway network for Dick Simnel's newly invented steam locomotive. Other characters in this series include Adora Belle Dearheart, Lipwig's acerbic, chain-smoking love interest; Gladys, a golem who develops a strange crush on Lipwig; Stanley Howler, an obsessive young man who was raised by peas and becomes the Discworld's first stamp collector; and the very old Junior Postman Groat, who never got promoted to Senior Postman because there was never a Postmaster alive long enough to promote him.

=== Discworld cultures ===
Several other books can be grouped together as "Other cultures of Discworld" books. They may contain characters or locations from other arcs, typically not as protagonist or antagonist but as a supporting character or even a throwaway reference. These include Pyramids (Djelibeybi), Small Gods (Omnia), and Monstrous Regiment (Zlobenia and Borogravia).

== Composition ==
Very few of the Discworld novels have chapter divisions. Instead, they feature interweaving storylines. Pratchett was quoted as saying that he "just never got into the habit of chapters", later adding that "I have to shove them in the putative YA books because my editor screams until I do". However, the first Discworld novel The Colour of Magic was divided into "books", as is Pyramids. Additionally, Going Postal and Making Money both have chapters, a prologue, an epilogue, and brief teasers of what is to come in each chapter, in the style of A. A. Milne, Jules Verne, and Jerome K. Jerome.

== Characters ==
Short descriptions of many of the notable characters:

- Ankh-Morpork City Watch members
- Death (Discworld)
- Nac Mac Feegle (Pictsies) and Gnomes
- Witches (Discworld)
- Unseen University
- Other Discworld characters

== Bibliography ==
=== Novels ===
No.	Title	Published	Transworld sub-series	Discworld Emporium sub-series	Notes
1	The Colour of Magic	1983	Wizards	Unseen University	First edition cover artwork by Josh Kirby. 93rd in the Big Read
2	The Light Fantastic	1986	Wizards	Unseen University	Continues from The Colour of Magic
3	Equal Rites	1987	Witches	Witches	
4	Mort	1987	Death	Death	65th in the Big Read
5	Sourcery	1988	Wizards	Unseen University	
6	Wyrd Sisters	1988	Witches	Witches	135th in the Big Read
7	Pyramids	1989		Gods	British Science Fiction Award winner, 1989
8	Guards! Guards!	1989	City Watch	City Watch	69th in the Big Read
9	Eric	1990		Unseen University	Published in a larger format and fully illustrated by Josh Kirby
10	Moving Pictures	1990		Unseen University	
11	Reaper Man	1991	Death	Death	126th in the Big Read
12	Witches Abroad	1991	Witches	Witches	197th in the Big Read
13	Small Gods	1992		Gods	102nd in the Big Read
14	Lords and Ladies	1992	Witches	Witches	
15	Men at Arms	1993	City Watch	City Watch	148th in the Big Read
16	Soul Music	1994	Death	Death	151st in the Big Read
17	Interesting Times	1994	Wizards	Unseen University	
18	Maskerade	1995	Witches	Witches	
19	Feet of Clay	1996	City Watch	City Watch	
20	Hogfather	1996	Death	Death	137th in the Big Read; British Fantasy Award nominee, 1997
21	Jingo	1997	City Watch	City Watch	
22	The Last Continent	1998	Wizards	Unseen University	
23	Carpe Jugulum	1998	Witches	Witches	
24	The Fifth Elephant	1999	City Watch	City Watch	153rd in the Big Read; Locus Award (Fantasy) nominee, 2000
25	The Truth	2000		Industrial revolution	193rd in the Big Read
26	Thief of Time	2001	Death	Death	The last to have original cover artwork by Josh Kirby. 152nd in the Big Read; Locus Award nominee, 2002
27	The Last Hero	2001			Published in a larger format and fully illustrated by Paul Kidby — the first in the line of his original release cover artwork for all subsequent Discworld novels (bar the 28th).
28	The Amazing Maurice and His Educated Rodents	2001		Younger readers	The only novel to have original cover artwork by David Wyatt. A YA (young adult or children's) Discworld book; winner of the 2001 Carnegie Medal
29	Night Watch	2002	City Watch	City Watch	Received the Prometheus Award in 2003; came 73rd in the Big Read; Locus Award nominee, 2003
30	The Wee Free Men	2003	Tiffany Aching	Younger readers	The second YA Discworld book; also later published in 2008 in a fully illustrated by Stephen Player larger format edition.
31	Monstrous Regiment	2003		Industrial revolution	2004 nominee for Locus Award for Best Fantasy Novel. The title is a reference to The First Blast of the Trumpet Against the Monstruous Regiment of Women
32	A Hat Full of Sky	2004	Tiffany Aching	Younger readers	The third YA Discworld book
33	Going Postal	2004		Industrial revolution	nominated for both the Locus and the Nebula Awards, 2005
34	Thud!	2005	City Watch	City Watch	Locus Award nominee, 2006
35	Wintersmith	2006	Tiffany Aching	Younger readers	The fourth YA book.
36	Making Money	2007		Industrial revolution	Locus Award winner, Nebula nominee, 2008
37	Unseen Academicals	2009	Wizards	Unseen University	Locus Award nominee, 2010
38	I Shall Wear Midnight	2010	Tiffany Aching	Younger readers	The fifth YA book, Andre Norton winner, 2010
39	Snuff	2011	City Watch	City Watch	The third-fastest-selling hardback adult-readership novel since records began in the UK, selling 55,000 copies in the first three days.
40	Raising Steam	2013		Industrial revolution	
41	The Shepherd's Crown	2015	Tiffany Aching	Younger readers	The sixth YA book, Completed mid-2014 and published posthumously in 2015

=== Short stories ===
Short stories by Pratchett based in the Discworld, including published miscellanea such as the fictional game origins of Thud, were reprinted in Pratchett's collection A Blink of the Screen (2012), and elsewhere.

- "Troll Bridge" – in After The King: Stories in honour of J. R. R. Tolkien (1992); reprinted in The Mammoth Book of Comic Fantasy edited by Mike Ashley (1998); available online
- "Theatre of Cruelty" (1993); available online
- "The Sea and Little Fishes" – in Legends (1998), anthology of novellas taking place within popular fantasy cycles edited by Robert Silverberg
- "Death and What Comes Next" (2002); available online
- "A Collegiate Casting-Out of Devilish Devices" (2005) – first published in the 13 May 2005 issue of The Times Higher Education Supplement included in certain editions of Snuff; available online

Seven of the short stories or short writings were also collected in a compilation of the majority of Pratchett's known short work named Once More* With Footnotes (2004).

Additionally, another short story "Turntables of the Night" (1989) is set in England but features Death as a character; it is available online and in both anthologies.

Five short stories republished in A Stroke of the Pen: The Lost Stories (2023) constitute the first known works by Pratchett that include early versions of places and characters that would later become parts of Discworld. Pratchett authored most of them under a pseudonym that remained unlinked to him for decades, until posthumously discovered in 2022.

=== "Mapps" ===
Although Terry Pratchett said, "There are no maps. You can't map a sense of humour," there are four "Mapps": The Streets of Ankh-Morpork (1993), The Discworld Mapp (1995), A Tourist Guide to Lancre (1998), and Death's Domain (1999). The first two were drawn by Stephen Player, based on plans by Pratchett and Stephen Briggs, the third is a collaboration between Briggs and Paul Kidby, and the last is by Kidby. All also contain booklets written by Pratchett and Briggs. Terry later collaborated with the Discworld Emporium to produce two much larger works, each with the associated map with the book in a folder, The Compleat Ankh-Morpork City Guide (2012) and The Compleat Discworld Atlas (2015).

==== Death's Domain ====
Death's Domain
- Dust cover of first edition
- Author: Terry Pratchett and Stephen Briggs
- Illustrator: Paul Kidby
- Cover artist: Paul Kidby
- Language: English
- Series: Discworld Mapp
- Genre: Fantasy
- Publisher: Corgi
- Publication date: 1999
- Publication place: United Kingdom
- Media type: Print (Paperback)
- Pages: 27 pp
- ISBN: 0-552-14672-2
- Preceded by: A Tourist Guide to Lancre

Death's Domain is a book by Terry Pratchett and Stephen Briggs, and illustrated by Paul Kidby. It is the fourth in the Mapp series. It was first published in paperback by Corgi in 1999. It was the second in the series to be illustrated by Kidby. As with the other "mapps", the basic design and booklet were compiled by Pratchett and Briggs.

The Mapp shows the parasite universe of Death's Domain. The accompanying booklet provides various details of the Domain, both as portrayed in the Discworld books and newly revealed.

In Death's Domain, the concept of steam locomotives on Discworld is introduced, which became the main theme of Pratchett's Discworld novel Raising Steam fourteen years later.

In the live-action adaptations of Hogfather and The Colour of Magic, Dorney Court is the real-life location used for the exterior of Mon Repos, Death's house.

=== Science books ===
Pratchett also collaborated with Ian Stewart and Jack Cohen on four books, using the Discworld to illuminate popular science topics. Each book alternates chapters of a Discworld story and notes on real science related to it. The books are:

- The Science of Discworld (1999). ISBN 978-0-09-186515-3.
- The Science of Discworld II: The Globe (2002). ISBN 978-0-09-188805-3.
- The Science of Discworld III: Darwin's Watch (2005). ISBN 978-0-09-189823-6.
- The Science of Discworld IV: Judgement Day (2013). ISBN 978-0-09-194979-2.

=== Quiz books ===
David Langford has compiled two Discworld quiz books:

- The Unseen University Challenge (1996), parodying the TV quiz show University Challenge. ISBN 978-0-575-60000-3.
- The Wyrdest Link (2002), parodying the TV quiz show The Weakest Link. ISBN 978-0-575-07319-7

=== Diaries ===
Most years see the release of a Discworld Diary and Discworld Calendar, both usually following a particular theme.

The diaries feature background information about their themes. Some topics are later used in the series; the character of Miss Alice Band first appeared in the Assassins' Guild Yearbook, for example.

The Discworld Almanak – The Year of The Prawn has a similar format and general contents to the diaries.

=== Other books ===
Other Discworld publications include:

- The Josh Kirby Discworld Portfolio (1993) A collection of Josh Kirby's artwork, published by Paper Tiger. ISBN 978-1-85028-259-4.
- The Discworld Companion (1994) An encyclopedia of Discworld information, compiled by Pratchett and Briggs. ISBN 978-0-575-05764-7.
  - An updated version was released in 2003, titled The New Discworld Companion. ISBN 978-0-575-07555-9.
  - A further updated version was released in 2012, titled Turtle Recall: The Discworld Companion . . . So Far. ISBN 978-0-575-09120-7.
  - A new updated version was released in 2021, titled The Ultimate Discworld Companion. ISBN 978-1-473-22350-9.
- The Pratchett Portfolio (1996) A collection of Paul Kidby's artwork, with notes by Pratchett. ISBN 978-0-575-06348-8.
- Nanny Ogg's Cookbook (1999) A collection of Discworld recipes, combined with etiquette, language of flowers etc., written by Pratchett with Stephen Briggs and Tina Hannan. Illustrated by Paul Kidby. ISBN 978-0-385-60005-7.
- The Art of Discworld (2004) Another collection of Paul Kidby's art. ISBN 978-0-06-075827-1.
- The Discworld Almanak (2004) An almanac for the Discworld year, in the style of the Diaries and the Cookbook, written by Pratchett with Bernard Pearson. ISBN 978-0-385-60683-7.
- Where's My Cow? (2005) A Discworld picture book referenced in Thud! and Wintersmith, written by Pratchett with illustrations by Melvyn Grant. ISBN 978-0-385-60937-1.
- The Unseen University Cut Out Book (2006) Build your own Unseen University, written by Pratchett with Alan Batley and Bernard Pearson, published 1 October 2006. ISBN 978-0-385-60944-9
- The Wit and Wisdom of Discworld (2007) A collection of quotations from the series. ISBN 978-0-385-61177-0
- The Folklore of Discworld (2008) A collaboration with British folklorist Jacqueline Simpson, discussing the myths and folklore used in Discworld. ISBN 978-0-385-61100-8
- The World of Poo (2012) Another in-universe children's book (similar to Where's My Cow), referenced in Snuff. ISBN 978-0-85752-121-7
- The Compleat Ankh-Morpork: City Guide (2012) The complete guide to the city of Ankh-Morpork. ISBN 978-0-85752-074-6
- Mrs Bradshaw's Handbook (2014) A guide book to the new railway system on the Disc; a parody of Bradshaw's Guides, and mentioned in Raising Steam. ISBN 978-0-85752-243-6.
- The Compleat Discworld Atlas (2015) A follow-up to The Compleat Ankh-Morpork, and the Discworld Emporium's final collaboration with Terry Pratchett. ISBN 978-0-85752-130-9.
- The Ankh-Morpork Archives Vol. 1 (2019) and Vol. 2 (2020) – anthologies of material written for the Discworld Diaries.
- The Nac Mac Feegle's Big Wee Alphabet Book (2022) – a parody of children's alphabet books, using words from the Scots-like Feegle language. ISBN 978-1-99980-810-5.
- Mr Bunnsy Has an Adventure (2023) – a tie-in with The Amazing Maurice, a facsimile of the book from the story based on the version seen in the film.
- Tiffany Aching's Guide to Being a Witch (2023) – the first published Discworld work written by Rhianna Pratchett, announced in May 2023. Co-authored with Gabrielle Kent and illustrated by Paul Kidby.
- The Discworld Bestiary (2026) – A fully illustrated guide to the creatures of Discworld, featuring artwork by Paul Kidby and presented with annotations and commentary from the wizard Rincewind.

== Reading order ==
The books take place roughly in real time and the characters' ages change to reflect the passing of years. The meetings of various characters from different narrative threads (e.g., Ridcully and Granny Weatherwax in Lords and Ladies, Rincewind and Carrot in The Last Hero) indicate that all the main storylines take place around the same period (end of the Century of the Fruitbat, beginning of the Century of the Anchovy). The main exception is the stand-alone book Small Gods, which appears to take place at some point earlier than most of the other stories, though even this contains cameo appearances by Death and the Librarian.

Some main characters may make cameo appearances in other books where they are not the primary focus; for example, City Watch members Carrot Ironfoundersson and Angua appear briefly in Going Postal, Making Money, and Unseen Academicals (placing those books after Guards! Guards! and Men at Arms). A number of characters, such as members of staff of Unseen University and Lord Vetinari, appear prominently in many different storylines without having specific storylines of their own. The two most frequently recurring central protagonists, Rincewind and Sam Vimes, are very briefly in a room together in The Last Hero, but they do not interact.

== Continuation ==
After Terry Pratchett was diagnosed with Alzheimer's disease, he said that he would be happy for his daughter Rhianna to continue the series. Pratchett co-founded Narrativia in 2012 along with Rob Wilkins to serve as a production company for adaptations of his works, with Rhianna as a member of its writing team. Rhianna Pratchett said that she would be involved in spin-offs, adaptations and tie-ins, but there would be no more novels. The first such spin-off by Rhianna was the tie-in book Tiffany Aching's Guide to Being a Witch, co-written with children's author Gabrielle Kent.

== Adaptations ==
=== Audiobooks ===
Most of Pratchett's novels have been released as audio cassette and CD audiobooks.

- Unabridged recordings of books 1–23 in the above list, except for books 3, 6 and 9, are read by Nigel Planer. Books 3 and 6 are read by Celia Imrie. Book 9 and most of the books from 24 onward are read by Stephen Briggs.
- Abridged versions are read by Tony Robinson.
- Fantastic Audio also recorded two Discworld novels: Thief of Time and Night Watch.
- Penguin have released a new line of Discworld audiobooks between 2022 and 2023. Voice talent includes Andy Serkis, Ariyon Bakare, Richard Coyle, Jon Culshaw, Colin Morgan, Indira Varma, and Sian Clifford, as well as Peter Serafinowicz and Bill Nighy. The theme music was composed by James Hannigan.

=== Comics ===
The Colour of Magic, The Light Fantastic, Mort, Guards! Guards!, and Small Gods have been adapted into graphic novels. Adaptations of Thief of Time (originally to be published on 2nd April 2026, but now expected in September 2027), The Wee Free Men (expected Spring 2027), and Monstrous Regiment (originally due in Autumn 2026) have been announced but not yet released.

=== Film and television ===
Due in part to the complexity of the novels, Discworld has been difficult to adapt to film – Pratchett was fond of an anecdote of a producer attempting to pitch an adaptation of Mort in the early 1990s but was told to "lose the Death angle" by US backers.

==== Cosgrove Hall series (1996–1997) ====
Cosgrove Hall produced several animated adaptations for Channel 4 from 1996 to 1997. All three star Christopher Lee as Death. These were made available on DVD and VHS in the US from Acorn Media.

- Welcome to the Discworld (1996) – an 8-minute animated television adaptation of a fragment of Reaper Man.
- Soul Music (1997) – also featuring Neil Morrissey and Graham Crowden. The soundtrack to Soul Music was also released on CD, and an accompanying book with stills and script was released.
- Wyrd Sisters (1997) – starring Annette Crosbie, June Whitfield, Jane Horrocks and Les Dennis.

==== Sky TV films (2006–2010) ====
Three television films were commissioned by Sky One in the late 2000s, each of which were broadcast in two parts. Terry Pratchett cameos as a minor character in all three.

- Terry Pratchett's Hogfather (2006), an adaptation of Hogfather with Ian Richardson as Death, David Jason as Albert and Michelle Dockery as Susan Sto Helit. It was first broadcast in December 2006.
- Terry Pratchett's The Colour of Magic (2008), based on both The Colour of Magic and The Light Fantastic, starring David Jason as Rincewind. Christopher Lee replaces the late Ian Richardson in the role of Death.
- Terry Pratchett's Going Postal (2010), an adaptation of Going Postal starring Richard Coyle, David Suchet, Charles Dance, Claire Foy, Steve Pemberton, Andrew Sachs and Tamsin Greig.

==== Full-length feature film ====
The Amazing Maurice is a UK-Germany co-production CGI-animated feature film, with a screenplay by Terry Rossio closely adapting the 28th Discworld stand-alone novel The Amazing Maurice and His Educated Rodents of 2001. The film stars the voices of Hugh Laurie — as the eponymous lead character of the streetwise talking ginger tomcat Maurice, who befriends a group of talking rats and a pet human to run a money-spinning "Pied Piper" scam across Discworld — with Emilia Clarke, Himesh Patel, Gemma Arterton, Ariyon Bakare, David Tennant, Julie Atherton, Joe Sugg, Rob Brydon, Hugh Bonneville, David Thewlis, and Peter Serafinowicz cameoing as Death. The film's musical score was composed by Tom Howe with English singer-songwriter Gabrielle Aplin. It had its premiere at the Manchester Animation Festival on 13 November 2022 before going on to general release at the end of 2022.

The same film production companies are putting together a CGI-animated feature film sequel to this film due for release in 2027.

==== Other adaptations ====
- Run Rincewind Run! (2007): A Snowgum Films original story created as a short film for Nullus Anxietas, the Australian Discworld convention. Stars Troy Larkin as Rincewind, and features Terry Pratchett as himself.
- Troll Bridge (2019): A live-action / hand-animated short film by the Australian group Snowgum Films. It premiered at the Flickerfest International Film Festival in January 2019.
- The Watch, a TV series inspired by the Ankh-Morpork City Watch, The Watch has been in development by Terry and then Rhianna Pratchett since 2011. It was greenlit as an eight-episode series by BBC America in October 2018, with Simon Allen as writer and Hilary Salmon, Ben Donald, Rob Wilkins and Phil Collinson as executive producers. However, Rhianna Pratchett has since distanced herself from the adaptation.

==== Fan works ====
- Mort (2001): A fan movie adaptation of the eponymous novel by Orange Cow Production, 26 minutes.
- Lords and Ladies (2005): A fan movie adaptation of Lords and Ladies by Almost No Budget Films was completed in Germany.

=== Radio ===
There have been several BBC Radio adaptations of Discworld stories, including:

- Eric (1990), a 4-part dramatised adaptation began airing on BBC Radio 4 on 6 March 2013.
- Guards! Guards!, six 30-minutes episodes, first broadcast in 1992, narrated by Martin Jarvis
- Mort, four 30-minutes episodes, first broadcast in 2004, starring Anton Lesser and Geoffrey Whitehead
- Night Watch five 30-minutes episodes, first broadcast in 2008, starring Ben Onwukwe and Philip Jackson
- Small Gods, four 30-minutes episodes, first broadcast in 2006, starring Anton Lesser
- Wyrd Sisters, four 30-minutes episodes, first broadcast in 1995, starring Sheila Hancock, Lynda Baron and Deborah Berlin

=== Stage ===
- Stephen Briggs published stage adaptations of 18 Discworld novels. Most of them were first produced by the Studio Theatre Club in Abingdon, Oxfordshire. They include adaptations of The Truth, Maskerade, Mort, Wyrd Sisters and Guards! Guards!
- Irana Brown directed her adaptation of Lords and Ladies, first performed in 1995 at the Winton Studio Theatre. Her adaptation was published in 2001 by Samuel French, and is still being performed as of 2016.
- Allen Stroud directed his adaptation of Reaper Man in 1996, first performed at the Winton Studio Theatre. He retains the script version.
- A stage version of Eric, adapted by Scott Harrison and Lee Harris, was produced and performed by The Dreaming Theatre Company in July 2003 inside Clifford's Tower, the 700-year-old castle keep in York. It was revived in 2004 in a tour of England, along with Robert Rankin's The Antipope.
- Small Gods was adapted for the stage by Ben Saunders and was performed in February 2011 at the Assembly Rooms Theatre, Durham by Ooook! Productions and members of Durham Student Theatre. Ooook! Productions also adapted and staged Terry Pratchett's Night Watch (February 2012), Thief of Time (February 2013; adapted by Tim Foster), Lords and Ladies (February 2014, adapted by Irana Brown), Monstrous Regiment (2015), and Soul Music (February 2016; adapted by Imogen Eddleston).
- A stage version of Monstrous Regiment was produced by Lifeline Theatre in Chicago, Illinois in June, July, and August 2014 with an adaptation written by one of Lifeline's ensemble members, Chris Hainsworth.
- A stage musical version of Witches Abroad, adapted by Amy Atha-Nicholls, was performed at the 2016 International Discworld Convention.

=== Video games ===
- Two point-and-click adventure games were created in the 1990s- Discworld and Discworld II: Missing Presumed...!? (Mortality Bites in the US/North America).
  - The first follows Rincewind as he is asked to look into the sudden and mysterious appearance of a dragon in Ankh-Morpork, while the second has him investigating the mysterious disappearance of Death. Discworld released in 1995 for PC (MS-DOS), Macintosh, PlayStation, and Sega Saturn, being one of the first games for the original PlayStation, it came in a longbox case, rather than a CD Jewel case.
  - The direct sequel, Discworld II, released the following year for PC (MS-DOS and Microsoft Windows), PlayStation, and Sega Saturn. Eric Idle plays Rincewind. The game contains many hand-animated cutscenes.
- Another game, Discworld Noir, was released in 1999, for PC (Microsoft Windows) and PlayStation, exclusively in Europe. It is more of a detective story, following a novel main character – a PI named Lewton.

Other video games are:

- The Colour of Magic (ZX Spectrum, Amstrad CPC, Commodore 64)
- Discworld MUD (online multiuser dungeon, 1991), based on the novels
- Discworld: The Colour of Magic (Mobile phone, 2006)

== Merchandise ==
Various other types of related merchandise have been produced by cottage industries with an interest in the books, including Stephen Briggs, Bernard Pearson, Paul Kidby and Clarecraft.

Cripple Mr. Onion was originally a fictional card game played by characters in the novels Wyrd Sisters, Reaper Man, Witches Abroad, Men at Arms, Wintersmith and Lords and Ladies. A game called "Shibo Yangcong-San" (derived from Japanese 死亡 shibō, "death;" Chinese 洋蔥 yángcōng, "onion;" and the Japanese honorific さん -san) appears in Interesting Times as a tile game played in the Agatean Empire. This was used by Dr Andrew Millard and Prof. Terry Tao as the basis for an actual card game.

=== Games ===
- Thud, 2002, by Trevor Truran, publisher The Cunning Artificer. It resembles ancient Norse games such as Hnefatafl, and involves two unequal sides, Trolls and Dwarves with different moves and 'capture' abilities. The basic overall strategy is for the dwarfs to form a large group and for the trolls to try to stop them. A dwarf's strategy widely depends on how the trolls are advancing on the dwarf block. A good tactic therefore is to be prepared to sacrifice a few dwarfs to get in the way and slow down any trolls that are advancing into dangerous positions.
- Guards Guards, 2011, by Backspindle Games (Designers: Leonard Boyd & David Brashaw), Published in conjunction with Z-Man Games. This is a 'quest' game where players have to manoeuvre their piece around the board collecting stolen spells to return to the Unseen University, while dealing with various Discworld characters.
- Ankh-Morpork, 2011, by Martin Wallace, published by Treefrog Games. This is a game where each player has a secret victory condition, usually relating to owning buildings in, or controlling, various areas of the city of Ankh-Morpork. During the game, players play cards from their hand to place control elements in the city, remove other players' pieces, or otherwise manipulate the ownership of areas.
- The Witches, 2013, by Martin Wallace, published by Treefrog Games. This is a game aimed at younger players. They must move around the town of Lancre and its surrounds, dealing with 'problems' ranging from a sick pig to an invasion by vampires. It is a semi-cooperative game, in that all players can lose if the game wins, but if they resolve all the problems, then one of them will win.
- Clacks, 2014, by Backspindle Games (Designers: Leonard Boyd & David Brashaw), Published in conjunction with Z-Man Games. In this game players compete to send their 'message' on a clacks board while disrupting their opponents' messages. It resembles the game Amoeba, with its constantly changing board.
- There are several sets of fan-created rules for the card game "Cripple Mr Onion" which appears in the novels. One of them was published in Turtle Recall.

=== Musical releases ===
- James Hannigan: Terry Pratchett's Discworld – Main Audiobook Theme (2024; released via digital music outlets including Spotify and Apple Music)
- Dave Greenslade: Terry Pratchett's From the Discworld (1994; Virgin CDV 2738.7243 8 39512 2 2).
- Keith Hopwood: Soul Music—Terry Pratchett's Discworld, (1998; Proper Music Distribution / Pluto Music TH 030746), soundtrack to the animated adaptation of Soul Music.
- Steeleye Span: Wintersmith (2013; Park Records), a collection of folk-rock songs based on the book Wintersmith and on other Tiffany Aching stories. There is a spoken contribution by Terry Pratchett.

=== Roleplaying games ===
Pratchett co-authored a role-playing game using GURPS (Generic Universal Role-Playing System) with Phil Masters:

- GURPS Discworld (1998), using GURPS Lite.
- GURPS Discworld Also (2001), sequel to GURPS Discworld.
- Discworld Roleplaying Game (2002, Powered by GURPS, 2016 GURPS fourth edition).

=== Stamps ===
In August 2023, Royal Mail introduced a series of eight stamps based on Discworld characters, to mark the 40th anniversary of the first book's publication.

== Twin cities ==
- Wincanton, in Somerset, UK is twinned with Ankh-Morpork, and the town is the first to name streets after their fictional equivalents.

== Critical reception ==
On 5 November 2019, the BBC News listed The Discworld Series on its list of the 100 most influential novels.

== See also ==
- Craig Shaw Gardner
- Douglas Adams
- Discworld characters
- International Discworld Convention
- Josh Kirby
- Robert Asprin
- Turtles all the way down

== Literature ==
=== Books ===
- Anne Hiebert Alton, William C. Spruiell, ed. (2014). Discworld and the Disciplines: Critical Approaches to the Terry Pratchett Works. McFarland. ISBN 978-0-7864-7464-6.
- Andrew M. Butler (2001). Terry Pratchett: The Pocket Essential Guide. Pocket Essentials. ISBN 1-903047-39-0.
- Craig Cabell (2011). Terry Pratchett. John Blake Publishing. ISBN 978-1-84358-864-1.
- Marion Rana, ed. (2018). Terry Pratchett's Narrative Worlds: From Giant Turtles to Small Gods. Springer. ISBN 978-3-319-67298-4.

=== Chapters ===
- Sandra L. Beckett (2009). "Chapter Four All Ages Fantasy". Crossover Fiction: Global and Historical Perspectives. Routledge. pp. 146–147. ISBN 978-0-415-87936-1.
- David Buchbinder (2003). "The Orangutan in the Library The Comfort of Strangeness in Terry Pratchetts Discworld Novels". In Kerry Mallan; Sharyn Pearce (eds.). Youth Cultures: Texts, Images, and Identities. Greenwood Publishing Group. pp. 169–182. ISBN 0-275-97409-X.
- Gideon Haberkorn, Verena Reinhardt (2011). "Magic Adolescence and Education on Terry Pratchetts Discworld". Supernatural Youth. Lexington Books. pp. 43–64. ISBN 978-0-7391-2859-6.
- Graham Harvey (2006). "Discworld and Otherworld: The Imaginative Use of Fantasy Literature". In Lynne Hume; Kathleen McPhillips (eds.). Popular Spiritualities: The Politics of Contemporary Enchantment. Ashgate Publishing. pp. 43–45. ISBN 978-0-7546-3999-2.
- Peter Hunt (2005). "Chapter 3. Terry Pratchett". Alternative Worlds in Fantasy Fiction. A&C Black. pp. 86–121. ISBN 0-8264-7760-7.
- David Langford (2003). Introduction to Terry Pratchett: Guilty of Literature (Up Through an Empty House of Stars ed.). Wildside Press LLC. pp. 256–262. ISBN 978-1-59224-055-5. (см. также пересказ)

=== Journal articles ===
- Kristin Noone (2010). "Shakespeare in Discworld: Witches, Fantasy, and Desire". Journal of the Fantastic in the Arts. 21 (1): 26–40. JSTOR 24352335.
