= Trevor Truran =

Trevor Truran (born 1942) is a United Kingdom former mathematics teacher, best known as the creator of many games and puzzles. Truran began making up games as mathematical teaching aids. At one time his entire mathematics course for 9-13 year olds was based on games, puzzles and story situations.

Early games were published in Games & Puzzles Magazine and he became Puzzles Editor of that magazine and later of Top Puzzles. For over 13 years he wrote for Computer Talk magazine and included many new games and puzzles as well as early articles on the Rubik's Cube. A nine-part puzzle Treasure Trail appeared in the Sunday Telegraph and he freelanced for many magazines and newspapers before taking up puzzling full-time in 1985 with the publishers now called Puzzler Media Ltd. In that time he has created and edited a wide variety of magazines from Wordsearch to mathematical but has largely concentrated on logical puzzling, providing much of the content to magazines such as Logical Puzzles.

He is the inventor of the logical puzzle now known as Mosaic (1980s) which was developed by Conceptis Ltd. and which had its first success on Japanese telephones.

He is credited by some as a possible founder or early creator of what might be called cross-referencing or row-and-column puzzles, where numbers outside a grid give information as to what to put inside the grid. An early example is Whittleword (1979) which was followed by Domino Deal, Ace in Place and others.

He is currently a Managing Editor at Puzzler Media Ltd. and edits Sudoku and Kakuro magazines as well as Hanjie, Hashi, Super Hanjie, Mosaic, Enigma and Colour Hanjie. He also contributes to other magazines such as Tough Puzzles and has created the "Squiffy Sudokus" for a Carol Vorderman book.

A chance meeting with Bernard Pearson led to an involvement with Terry Pratchett's Discworld fantasy setting, and the game Thud was the first result. A second edition followed in 2005 to tie-in with the novel inspired by the game, Thud!, which also features a faster, shorter game, "Koom Valley Thud", reflecting incidents in the book. A third edition of the game is still in print, and it has also been translated into Dutch. Truran also designed another Discworld game, Watch Out, another two-player game pitting members of the Ankh-Morpork City Watch against members of the Thieves Guild. It was publicly tested in 2004 but not eventually published, as according to Bernard Pearson it was not thought to be "sufficiently Discworld".

== Publications ==
He has published two books:

- Masterful Mindbenders (puzzle collection)
- Hanjie Solved (A guide to Japanese logic picture puzzles - 2005)
