= Tina Hannan =

Tina Hannan is a London-based writer and photographer, noted for the book Nanny Ogg's Cookbook, co-written with fantasy author Terry Pratchett in association with Stephen Briggs and Paul Kidby as a companion to the Discworld series. Hannan, then working in a public house in Berkshire, provided the recipes for the work.

Hannan has also contributed to the Comic Relief fundraising book "Shaggy Blog Stories" as one of the top 100 funniest stories in the UK blogosphere. She currently lives in West London.
