= A Blink of the Screen =

2012 short fiction anthology by Terry Pratchett

- Author: Terry Pratchett
- Illustrator: Josh Kirby
- Language: English
- Genre: Fantasy, science fiction
- Publisher: Doubleday
- Publication date: October 11, 2012
- Pages: 318
- ISBN: 978-0-385-61898-4

A Blink of the Screen is a 2012 collection of short fiction by Terry Pratchett. Spanning the author's entire career, the collection contains almost all of his short fiction, whether set in the Discworld or not.

== Contents ==
- Foreword by A. S. Byatt
- Non-Discworld Shorter Writings
1. "The Hades Business" (1963)
2. "Solution" (1964)
3. "The Picture" (1965)
4. "The Prince and the Partridge" (1968)
5. "Rincemangle, The Gnome of Even Moor" (1973)
6. "Kindly Breathe in Short, Thick Pants" (1976)
7. "The Glastonbury Tales" (1977)
8. "There's No Fool Like an Old Fool Found in an English Queue" (1978)
9. "Coo, They've Given Me the Bird" (1978)
10. "And Mind the Monoliths" (1978)
11. "The High Meggas" (1986)
12. "Twenty Pence, with Envelope and Seasonal Greeting" (1987)
13. "Incubust" (1988)
14. "Final Reward" (1988)
15. "Turntables of the Night" (1989)
16. "#ifdef DEBUG + 'world/enough' + 'time'" (1990)
17. "Hollywood Chickens" (1990)
18. "The Secret Book of the Dead" (1991)
19. "Once and Future" (1995)
20. "FTB" (1996)
21. "Sir Joshua Easement: A Biographical Note" (2010)
- Discworld Shorter Writings
1. "Troll Bridge" (1992)
2. "Theatre of Cruelty" (1993)
3. "The Sea and Little Fishes" (1998)
4. "The Ankh-Morpork National Anthem" (1999)
5. "Medical Notes" (2002)
6. "Thud: A Historical Perspective" (2002)
7. "A Few Words from Lord Havelock Vetinari" (2002)
8. "Death and What Comes Next" (2002)
9. "A Collegiate Casting-Out of Devilish Devices" (2005)
10. "Minutes of the Meeting to Form the Proposed Ankh-Morpork Federation of Scouts" (2007)
11. "The Ankh-Morpork Football Association Hall of Fame playing cards" (2009)
- Appendix
1. Deleted extract from "The Sea and Little Fishes" (1998)
2. List of Illustrations
