= The Wit and Wisdom of Discworld =

Compilation of quotes from Discworld novels

Wit and Wisdom of Discworld
- Author: Terry Pratchett; Stephen Briggs
- Language: English
- Series: Discworld
- Subject: Discworld
- Genre: Fantasy
- Publisher: Doubleday
- Publication date: 2007
- ISBN: 9780385611770

The Wit and Wisdom of Discworld is an accessory book to the Discworld series by Terry Pratchett. It is a compilation of quotes from all the Discworld novels, amassed and prefaced by Stephen Briggs.

The book consists of the very best quotes, ideas and one-liners from all books in the Discworld series. The book is organised sequentially, beginning with quotes from The Colour of Magic and ending with Making Money, with each book being organised as a chapter. For each novel, a short synopsis (often the blurb from the novel) is provided to 'set the scene'. Many of the quotes are presented in such a way that even a relative Discworld novice could see the humour, although some require some knowledge of the Discworld universe (and the many unique characters that populate it) in order to be understood.

The introduction to the book, written by Stephen Briggs, states:

In producing this book, I have not tried to extract every single gag and witty exchange from the series. There are too many, and to do that, I might as well have tied a set of the novels up with string and added a tag: 'The Complete Wit of Pratchett'. Stephen Briggs

The cover of the book is presented as a sort of 'faux book of magic', as borrowed from the Unseen University library, complete with mystical runes, torn edges, and coated in spiderwebs.
