= GURPS Discworld =

1996 role-playing game using GURPS Lite set in Terry Pratchett's Discworld

- Cover art by Paul Kidby
- Designers: Phil Masters; Terry Pratchett
- Publishers: Steve Jackson Games
- Publication: 1998 (GURPS Discworld); 2002 (Discworld Role-Playing Game); 2017 (Discworld Roleplaying Game)
- Genres: Comedic fantasy
- Systems: GURPS Lite

GURPS Discworld is a comedic fantasy role-playing game using GURPS Lite (Generic Universal Role-Playing System), set in Terry Pratchett's Discworld fantasy universe, written by Phil Masters and Terry Pratchett, and first published by Steve Jackson Games in 1998.

== Contents ==
The game includes detail of Discworld, appealing to both roleplaying and Discworld fans. It has also been attributed to introducing roleplayers to the series of Discworld books.

== Publication history ==
GURPS Discworld was written by Phil Masters and Terry Pratchett with the cover and illustrations by Paul Kidby. It was published by Steve Jackson Games (SJG) in 1998. GURPS Discworld was the first book to include the GURPS Lite rules. The GURPS Lite rules were included as an appendix, allowing it to be played without the full GURPS Basic rules.

In March 2001, SJG published a sequel called GURPS Discworld Also. It was written by Phil Masters, and Terry Pratchett. Cover and illustrations were done by Sean Murray. The supplement covered recent events in the book series, including details about the Unseen University. Among the scenarios included is EckEckEcksEcksian Cart Wars, based on the Mad Max parody segments of The Last Continent and SJG's own Car Wars and GURPS Autoduel setting. It also included the first detailed rules for mechanical semaphore telegraphy, based on the "clacks" network in the books.

The original book was republished in 2002 by SJG with the GURPS Lite rules integrated throughout the text. The title was changed from GURPS Discworld to Discworld Roleplaying Game to reinforce its stand-alone capabilities. Illustrations were once again done by Paul Kidby. Subsequent publications, including the second edition of Discworld, were labelled "Powered by GURPS rather than using GURPS in the book title, to make them easier to find at stores.

Discworld was adapted for the fourth edition of GURPS, combining the earlier two books along with new material, including a new magic system. The second edition was written, playtested and laid out in 2014, but had trouble getting to market, according to the SJG 2014 Stakeholder's Report. It was released as Discworld Roleplaying Game in December 2016, after Pratchett's death.

== Books ==
All published by Steve Jackson Games

- GURPS Discworld (1998)
- GURPS Discworld Also (2001)
- Discworld Roleplaying Game (2002, 2016)

== Reviews ==
- Envoyer #39
- Casus Belli #115
- Backstab #11
- Realms of Fantasy

== See also ==
- List of GURPS publications
