= The Streets of Ankh-Morpork =

1993 fictional map by Terry Pratchett and Stephen Briggs

- Author: Stephen Briggs with Terry Pratchett
- Illustrator: Stephen Player
- Language: English
- Series: Discworld
- Genre: Fantasy
- Publisher: Corgi Books
- Publication date: 4 November 1993
- Publication place: United Kingdom
- Media type: Print
- ISBN: 0-552-14161-5
- Followed by: The Discworld Mapp

The Streets of Ankh-Morpork is a map and brief guide of the fictional city of Ankh-Morpork in Discworld, a fantasy series by English author Terry Pratchett. The final, artwork-grade map was drawn by Stephen Player, who also drew the artwork for a later publication, The Discworld Mapp.
