= The World of Poo =

2012 children's book by Terry Pratchett

- Publisher: Doubleday
- Publication date: June 7, 2012
- ISBN: 978-0857521217

The World of Poo is an illustrated children's book written by Terry Pratchett and illustrated by Peter Dennis. It is based on the book featured in Pratchett's Discworld novel Snuff, in which Sam Vimes reads it to his now older son, replacing his previous favourite book, Where's My Cow?. The book is presented as a replica of Young Sam's own copy of the book, including a dedication from the fictional author, Miss Felicity Beedle.

The book chronicles the adventures of Geoffrey, a young boy sent to stay with his grandmother in Ankh-Morpork. After a bird defecates on his head and he is told it is lucky, he becomes obsessed with collecting samples of poo from various creatures in order to create a museum.

== See also ==
- Coprolite
- Paleofeces
