= The Discworld Almanak =

2004 book by Terry Pratchett

First edition (publ. Doubleday) Cover artist: Paul Kidby

The Discworld Almanak is a spin-off book from Terry Pratchett's Discworld novels, in a similar format to the Diaries and Nanny Ogg's Cookbook. It was written by Pratchett and Bernard Pearson and published in 2004.

The book takes the form of an almanac rather than a themed "diary" like the others in the series for the Discworld Year of the Prawn, and offers astrological predictions (using the complex Discworld zodiac, in which every constellation is a birthsign, and the Turtle moves fast enough that they change frequently), and agricultural advice (including an awful lot about cabbages).

Like Nanny Ogg's Cookbook it is enlivened by a series of "pinned on" notes between the publisher and the head printer. These include the revelation that the horoscopes are written by the God of Astrology.
