= Moving Pictures (novel) =

1990 Discworld novel by Terry Pratchett

- First edition
- Author: Terry Pratchett
- Cover artist: Josh Kirby
- Language: English
- Series: Discworld; 10th novel – 2nd individual story
- Subject: Movies and Hollywood; the Cthulhu Mythos; Atlantis; Characters: Victor Tugelbend, Theda Withel, C.M.O.T. Dibbler, Unseen University staff, Gaspode, Mustrum Ridcully; Locations: Ankh-Morpork, Holy Wood
- Genre: Fantasy
- Publisher: Victor Gollancz / Corgi
- Publication date: 1990
- ISBN: 0-575-04763-1
- Preceded by: Eric
- Followed by: Reaper Man

Moving Pictures is a fantasy novel by British writer Terry Pratchett, published in 1990, the tenth book in his Discworld series. The book takes place on Discworld in Ankh-Morpork and a hill called "Holy Wood".

== Plot ==
The novel begins with the death of Deccan Ribobe, the last member of an ancient order tasked with 'remembering' Holy Wood through ceremonial chanting, and the escape of an influence from Holy Wood Hill. Several months later, the alchemists of the Discworld have invented moving pictures. Many hopefuls are drawn by the siren call of Holy Wood, home of the fledgling "clicks" industry – among them Victor Tugelbend, a dropout from Ankh-Morpork's Unseen University and Theda "Ginger" Withel, a girl "from a little town you never ever heard of", and the Discworld's most infamous salesman, Cut-Me-Own-Throat Dibbler, who introduces commerce to the equation and becomes a successful producer. The business of making movies grows rapidly, and eventually Victor and Ginger become real stars, thanks to the help of Gaspode the sentient dog (who also develops a manager-client relationship with Laddie (a play on Lassie), who everybody considers to be the real Wonder Dog, although in fact is very simple-minded). Holy Wood for a while becomes an effervescent place full of humans, dwarfs, alchemists, demons (which essentially constitute the main technological device to make movies), and trolls (among whom is Detritus) all living in harmony.

Meanwhile, it gradually becomes clear that the production of movies is having a deleterious effect on the structure of reality. After Victor discovers the body of Deccan and the ancient order's record, Ginger is possessed by an unspecified entity and she and Victor find an ancient, hidden cinema, complete with a portal to the Dungeon Dimensions. Back in Ankh-Morpork, during the first screening of Blown Away (a parody of Gone with the Wind) which the senior wizards of the Unseen University are also attending, a creature from the Dungeon Dimensions breaks through. Victor fights it (in what eventually becomes a parody of the movie King Kong also featuring the Librarian of the Unseen University), having discovered that he could exploit Holy Wood magic and the narrative conventions of the clicks if he had a camera pointing at him. However, after the creature is defeated, Victor and the Librarian realise that the creatures will still try to get through from the Dungeon Dimensions and that Ginger in her possessed state was not trying to summon them but trying to keep them from coming through (possibly as a result of being descended from the High Priestess of Holy Wood). Returning to the ancient cinema at Holy Wood, Victor and Ginger witness a golden statue of a warrior (reminiscent of an Oscar) come to life and travel through the screen to defeat the creatures.

In the end most things return to normal (also because the Patrician and the wizards make it clear that they will not allow any more movies to be produced ever again), although dwarfs find themselves inexplicably singing "Hihohiho" while mining. Victor and Ginger have a last dialogue over the meaning of Holy Wood and being famous, and Gaspode and the other animals under the influence of Holy Wood lose their ability to reason and speak. The ending lines depict a poetic scene about the fragility of Holy Wood dreams.

== Characters ==
- Cut-me-own-Throat Dibbler
- Thomas Silverfish
- Victor Tugelbend aka Victor Maraschino
- Detritus
- Ruby
- Gaspode
- Theda Withel aka Ginger aka Delores de Syn
- Mustrum Ridcully
- Oswald, a parody of the Academy Award of Merit, also referenced as Osric and Osbert

== See also ==
- List of actors from Discworld

Reading order guide
Preceded by ~~Faust~~ Eric	10th Discworld Novel	Succeeded by Reaper Man
Preceded by Pyramids	2nd Individual Story; Published in 1990	Succeeded by Troll Bridge
