= A Tourist Guide to Lancre =

1998 fictional map by Terry Pratchett and Stephen Briggs

- First edition
- Author: Terry Pratchett and Stephen Briggs
- Illustrator: Paul Kidby
- Language: English
- Series: Discworld
- Genre: Fantasy
- Publisher: Corgi Books
- Publication date: 1998
- Publication place: United Kingdom
- Media type: Print
- ISBN: 0-552-14608-0
- Preceded by: The Discworld Mapp
- Followed by: Death's Domain

A Tourist Guide To Lancre is the third book in the Discworld Mapp series, published in January 1998, and the first to be illustrated by Paul Kidby. As with the other maps, the basic design and booklet were compiled by Terry Pratchett and Stephen Briggs.

== Contents ==
The authors Terry Pratchett and Stephen Briggs penned opening remarks. The rest of the book has small essays functioning as overviews of the Lancre, a mountain country at the Ramtops known as a hub of Witches and drawn in a vertigo-inducing perspective shot, rather than as a relief diagram. The accompanying booklet details the history, geography and folklore of the country. A large portion of the book is written by the experienced fictional hillwalker Eric Wheelbrace in a section called "Lancre Gateway to the Ramtops". The section discusses the people who live in the kingdom. Wheelbrace's essay "A Pictorial Guide to the Lancre Fells" provides hikers with tips. Briggs created line art for the walk between Lancre Town and the Dancers. The guide was modeled after the work of Alfred Wainwright, a fellwalker who created drawings of the paths and the topography of the guides he wrote about the Lake District and other areas.

The fictional character Nanny Ogg wrote the chapter "An additional Vue of Lankre". The chapter provides a more detailed explanation about Lancre and the witches who live there. The scholar Andrew M. Butler found the chapter "reads as if it were dictated to a scribe". Tiny drawings of objects like wirecutters and a compass are interspersed through the book. Ogg discusses the folklore in Lancre including the Witch Trials, A Mummers Play, and the Lancre Oozer. The book's final part has a map key depicting Lancre Town and Lancre Castle. The four extremities of the map feature Verence II's coat of arms and drawings of Nancy Ogg, Granny Weatherwax, the Queen of the Elves, and Herne the Hunted.

== History ==
Published in 1998, A Tourist Guide To Lancre is the third book in the Discworld Mapp series. Terry Pratchett and Stephen Briggs authored the book, and Paul Kidby painted Lancre. It was the first book in the series to be illustrated by Kidby. The book's subtitle is A Discworld Mapp Including a Pyctorial Guide to the Lancre Fells and a description of a picturefque and charming walk in thys charming and hospitable country. The Transworld imprint Corgi published the book with a print run of 75,000 copies. A Czech translation of the book was later produced. A Tourist Guide To Lancre and its sequel, Death's Domain (1999), had fewer sales than the series' first two instalments.

== Reception ==
The scholar Anne Hiebert Alton praised the book, writing, "The Lancre map provides an excellent sense of the sheer verticality of the Kingdom". She liked that it showcases "a better awareness than the novels do of the distance between Granny's cottage and Nanny's house in town" and said that the map "reinforces the idea of the geographic space of the Discworld".
