= The Discworld Mapp =

1995 fictional atlas by Terry Pratchett and Stephen Briggs

- Cover of Discworld Mapp atlas
- Author: Terry Pratchett and Stephen Briggs
- Illustrator: Stephen Player
- Language: English
- Series: Discworld
- Genre: Fantasy
- Publisher: Corgi Books
- Publication date: 9 November 1995
- Publication place: United Kingdom
- Media type: Print
- ISBN: 0-552-14324-3
- Preceded by: The Streets of Ankh-Morpork
- Followed by: A Tourist Guide to Lancre

The Discworld Mapp is an atlas that contains a large, fold out map of the Discworld fictional world, drawn by Stephen Player to the directions of Terry Pratchett and Stephen Briggs. It also contains a short booklet relating the adventures and explorers of the Disc and their discoveries.

Image of the map

It was originally conceived as the second in a series of three maps, along with The Streets of Ankh-Morpork and A Tourist Guide to Lancre. For this work, Briggs became known as the "cartographer of Discworld." A fourth atlas, Death's Domain, was added to the series.

After its publication, Pratchett was surprised to learn that British bookshops were displaying it in their nonfiction sections because, they argued, it was a real map, though of a fictional place.
