= The Unseen University Challenge =

Book of trivia questions by David Langford

First edition (publ. Gollancz Books)

The Unseen University Challenge is a book of trivia questions related to Terry Pratchett's Discworld novels. It was written by David Langford (with Terry Pratchett's permission) and was published in 1996. Its name is a reference to the television quiz University Challenge. Unseen University is the Wizard's university in Ankh-Morpork. The book was the number 6 best-seller in paperback non-fiction on 15 June 1996.

The quiz consists of 841 questions in several categories, named after various faculties of the university, such as Thaumatology, Arcane History, Dwarf Studies, and Oook. Each section contains a bonus question, and several ways exist to score more points for a question, many of them ludicrous.

David Langford has intentionally not based his questions on the Annotated Pratchett File, a long list of Discworld trivia available on the internet. Nevertheless, several items are in both the APF and the quizbook.

== Sequel ==
The Wyrdest Link is the sequel, featuring what might be Josh Kirby's last cover illustration for a Discworld-related book. The title is a reference to the 6th book of the series, Wyrd Sisters, and to the TV show The Weakest Link.

This book divides the questions into guilds. For example, if it is a question about a joke it may be categorised as in the Fools' Guild.
