= Shelfanger =

Village in England

Coordinates: 52.41054°N 1.09678°E

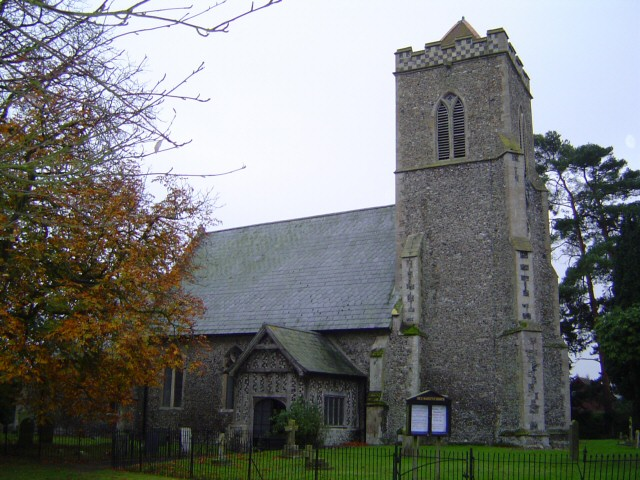
- All Saints' Church, Shelfhanger

- Location within Norfolk
- Area: 6.99 km^{2} (2.70 sq mi)
- Population: 378 (2011 census)
  - Density: 54/km^{2} (140/sq mi)
- OS grid reference: TM106837
- Civil parish: Shelfanger
- District: South Norfolk
- Shire county: Norfolk
- Region: East
- Country: England
- Sovereign state: United Kingdom
- Post town: DISS
- Postcode district: IP22
- Dialling code: 01379
- Police: Norfolk
- Fire: Norfolk
- Ambulance: East of England

Shelfanger is a village situated about 3 miles from the town of Diss, Norfolk, England. There is a church and a village hall in the village. It covers an area of 6.99 km^{2} (2.70 sq mi) and had a population of 362 in 150 households at the 2001 census, the population increasing to 378 at the 2011 census.

In previous years there was a school, a post office, a pub, three shops, a blacksmiths and a garage run by a family of brothers called Bowman. These have all now been closed down. Josh Kirby (died 2001), an artist lived there.

== History ==
The villages name means 'Shelf wood'.

This village has been previously recorded as Scelvangra, Schelfangyll, Shelfangles, Shelfhangre and Shelfhanger, though the significance of its name is largely unknown. In 1603, it had 142 communicants and in 1736 had nearly 40 dwellinghouses, and contained about 200 inhabitants.

== Notes ==
http://kepn.nottingham.ac.uk/map/place/Norfolk/Shelfanger
