= GURPS Lite =

1998 GURPS role-playing game rules

- Designers: Scott Haring; Sean Punch
- Publishers: Steve Jackson Games
- Publication: 1998 GURPS Lite third edition; 2004 GURPS Lite fourth edition
- Genres: Universal
- Systems: GURPS

GURPS Lite is a 32-page introductory rules set of the GURPS (Generic Universal Role-Playing System), written by Scott Haring and Sean Punch, and first published by Steve Jackson Games in 1998.

== Contents ==
GURPS Lite includes basic character creation with advantages, disadvantages, skills and equipment, as well as some rules for playing.

== Publication history ==
GURPS Lite was published in 1998 for GURPS third edition, as a 32-page version of the game, which allowed Steve Jackson Games (SJG) to publish standalone games without a need for the main GURPS rulebook. GURPS Discworld (1998) and GURPS WWII (2001) were the first supplements to make use of GURPS Lite, while later publications carried the label "Powered by GURPS" without the use of GURPS as part of the book title. It is available as a free PDF from the SJG website.

== See also ==
- List of GURPS publications
