= Troll Bridge =

1992 short story by Terry Pratchett

- Short story by Terry Pratchett
- Country: United Kingdom
- Language: English
- Genres: Fantasy clichés, Short story Characters Cohen the Barbarian Locations Death Bridge, Blade Mountains

Publication
- Published in: ISBN 0-330-32027-0
- Publication type: Compilation
- Publisher: Pan Books
- Media type: Print
- Publication date: 10/01/1992
- Series: Discworld; 1st short story – 3rd Individual story

"Troll Bridge" is a Discworld short story, written by Terry Pratchett in 1991 for a collection entitled After The King: Stories in Honour of J.R.R. Tolkien.

Set following the events of The Light Fantastic, the story stars Cohen the Barbarian, who plans to prove himself by killing a troll in single combat. Instead, he and the troll find themselves reminiscing about how the Discworld used to be, when trolls all hid under bridges to be killed by heroes, and the land was not yet settled.

== Film ==
While interested in making a short film of Troll Bridge as early as 2004, Snowgum Films slated it for release in 2015, starring Don Bridges as Cohen. Fundraising included a Kickstarter campaign in 2011.

The film premiered at Flickerfest in Sydney in January 2019, and played at film festivals and fan conventions around the world ahead of its release to crowdfunding supporters in November 2019. It is now freely available on YouTube.

Reading order guide
Preceded by Moving Pictures (novel)	3rd Individual Story; Published in 1992	Succeeded by Small Gods
