= Stephen Briggs =

British writer

- Born: 1951 (age 74–75); England
- Occupation: Writer
- Writing career
- Genre: Comic fantasy
- Notable works: The Discworld Mapp (co-author), The Discworld Companion (co-author)
- Website: stephenbriggs.com

Stephen Briggs (born 1951) is a British writer of subsidiary works and merchandise surrounding Terry Pratchett's comic fantasy Discworld. The Streets of Ankh-Morpork, the first Discworld map, was co-designed by Briggs and Pratchett and painted by Stephen Player in 1993. This was followed by The Discworld Mapp (1995), also painted by Stephen Player, and A Tourist Guide to Lancre (1998), painted by Paul Kidby.

Briggs also adapted over 20 Pratchett novels for the amateur stage – Wyrd Sisters, Mort, and Guards! Guards! (published by Corgi); The Amazing Maurice and His Educated Rodents, Johnny and the Dead, and Dodger (Oxford University Press); Going Postal, Night Watch, Interesting Times, The Fifth Elephant and The Truth (Methuen / A.& C. Black); Making Money, Carpe Jugulum and Maskerade (Samuel French); Feet of Clay, The Rince Cycle – mainly a combination of The Colour of Magic and The Light Fantastic – and Unseen Academicals (Oberon); his adaptations of Hogfather and Lords and Ladies were published in 2021 by Methuen Drama, along with The Shakespeare Codex – mainly an adaptation of The Science of Discworld 2 - the Globe .

The Discworld encyclopaedia The Discworld Companion, published in 1995 with updated editions in 1997 and 2003 (the latter entitled The New Discworld Companion, is derived from Briggs' database of Discworld information). The fourth edition of the Companion was published in 2012 under the title Turtle Recall. In 2007 Briggs published The Wit and Wisdom of Discworld, a compilation of quotes from the Discworld novels. He also collaborated with Pratchett in Discworld Diaries and Nanny Ogg's Cookbook. Briggs has also recorded audiobook versions of certain Discworld works, in editions released by Isis Publishing and by HarperCollins in the US.

In 2004, he received an Audie Award for his audiobook recording of Monstrous Regiment.
