= Theatre of Cruelty (short story) =

- Short story by Terry Pratchett
- First edition
- Language: English
- Genre(s): Fantasy clichés Characters Ankh-Morpork City Watch, Carrot Ironfoundersson, Death Locations Ankh-Morpork

Publication
- Publisher: Souvenir Press
- Publication date: 1993
- Series: Discworld; 2nd short story - 2nd City Watch story

"Theatre of Cruelty" is a short Discworld story by Terry Pratchett written in 1993. The name derives from a concept of Antonin Artaud (Theatre of Cruelty).

It was originally written for W. H. Smith Bookcase magazine and was then slightly modified and extended, being published again in the programme of the OryCon 15 convention, and then again in The Wizards of Odd, a compilation of fantasy short stories.

It has since been made available on the Internet along with dozens of translations by fans, with Pratchett having stated, "I don't want to see it distributed in print anywhere but don't mind people downloading it for their own enjoyment."

The story involves both the Ankh-Morpork City Watch and a parallel of Punch and Judy.

== Plot ==
A murder has been committed: a street entertainer, found apparently battered to death with a very small blunt object, on him bite marks from a very small crocodile. Investigating the incident in his typically direct manner, Carrot Ironfoundersson discovers the death was an accident, the man having choked on a swazzle. It emerges that the entertainer had invented a parallel, live-action version of Punch and Judy, using — and abusing — a troupe of gnomes as the live cast. Carrot asserts that such brutal theatre could never find favour in Ankh-Morpork: "That's not the way to do it".
