= Bernard Pearson =

British artist known best as Discworld fantasy illustrator

Bernard Stanley Pearson
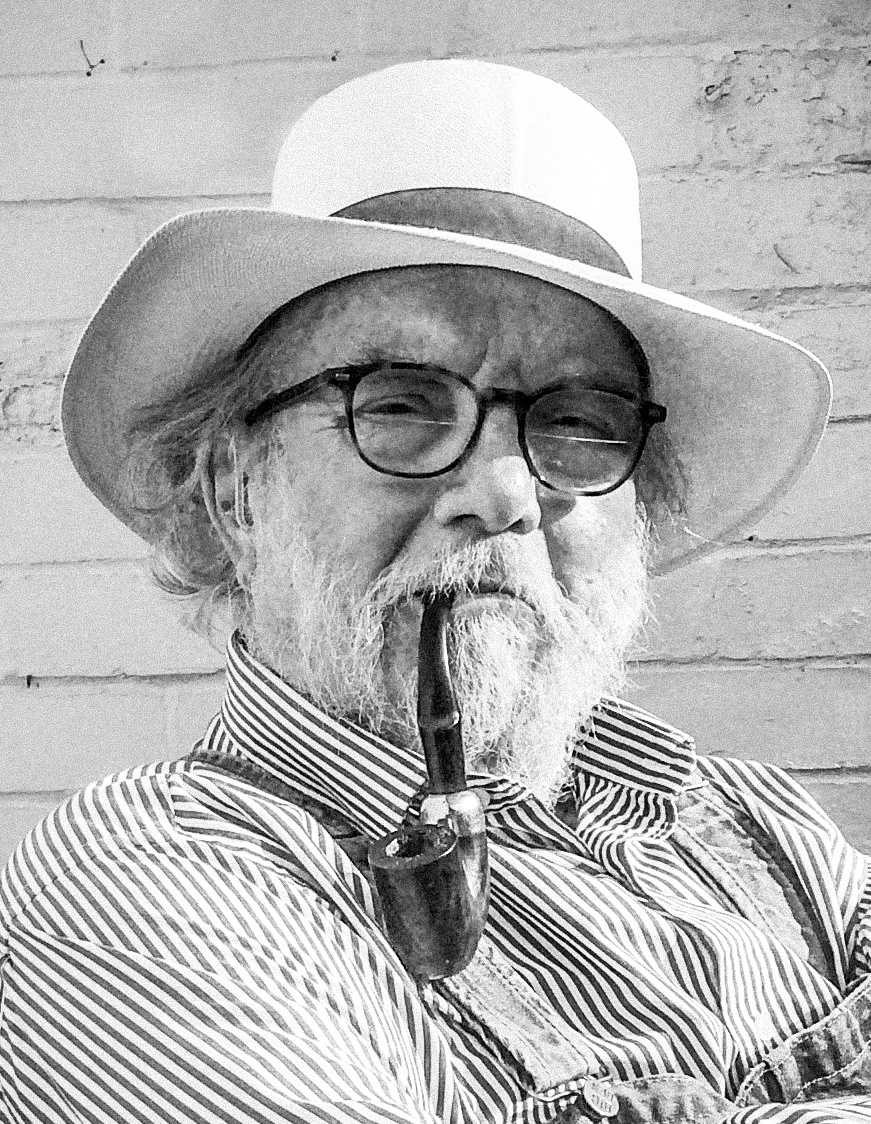
- Born: 13 September 1946 (age 78) London, England
- Occupation(s): Sculptor and author
- Known for: Figurines based on the Discworld series

Bernard Stanley Pearson (born 13 September, 1946) is a British potter, sculptor, and author. In 1981, Pearson helped to establish Clare Craft, a pottery company based in the Suffolk town of Clare. Clare Craft produced a variety of figurines, mostly centering around fantasy. Clare Craft designed multiple figurines based on characters from Terry Pratchett’s Discworld novels.

In 1997, at Pratchett’s suggestion, Pearson began crafting ‘The Unreal Estate’; a series of highly detailed architectural models based on Discworld locations, most notably the Unseen University. During this time, Pearson and his wife, Isobel, also created a wide range of studio pottery based on landscape and fantasy imagery under the back stamp of ‘Bernard Pearson Ceramics’.

In 2000, Pearson moved to the town of Wincanton in Somerset, England, where he established a Discworld centre and retail outlet called ‘The Cunning Artificer’, a name given to him by Terry Pratchett. Pearson his wife launched additional Discworld merchandise, including the ‘Discworld Stamps’. This collaboration with Terry Pratchett resulted in the creation of thousands of ‘Cinderella’ stamps that are held in private collections and even in the British Library. Pearson co-authored The Complete Discworld Almanack with Terry Pratchett in 2004. ‘The Cunning Artificer’ was renamed ‘The Discworld Emporium’ in 2011 when Ian Mitchell and Reb Voyce joined the partnership, setting up a successful online business shipping books and Discworld merchandise worldwide. Following the death of Terry Pratchett in 2015, Pearson assumed a more subsidiary role in the design and running of the Emporium.

In 2018, Pearson published his first novel, Dovetail, and has since continued to focus on writing. He published his second book, A Glastonbury Tale, in 2021.

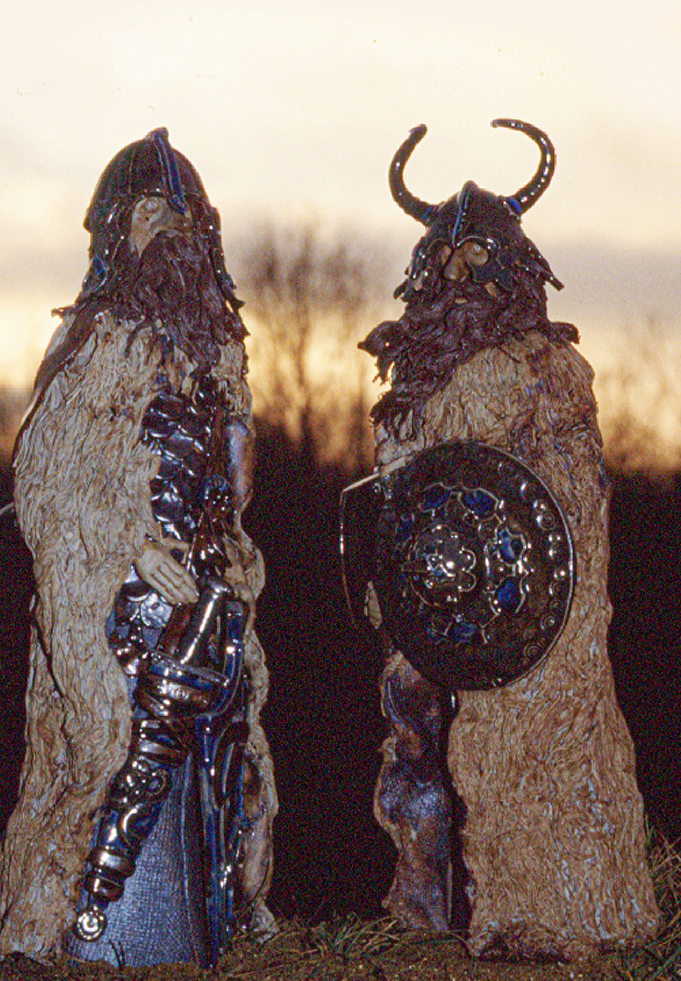
Early Clarecraft: Elven Knights

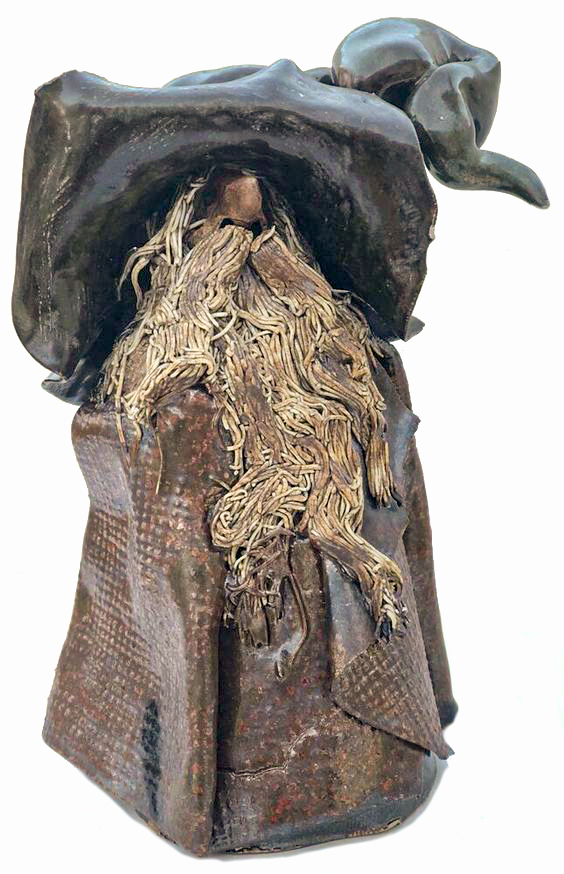
Early Clarecraft: Hedge Wizard

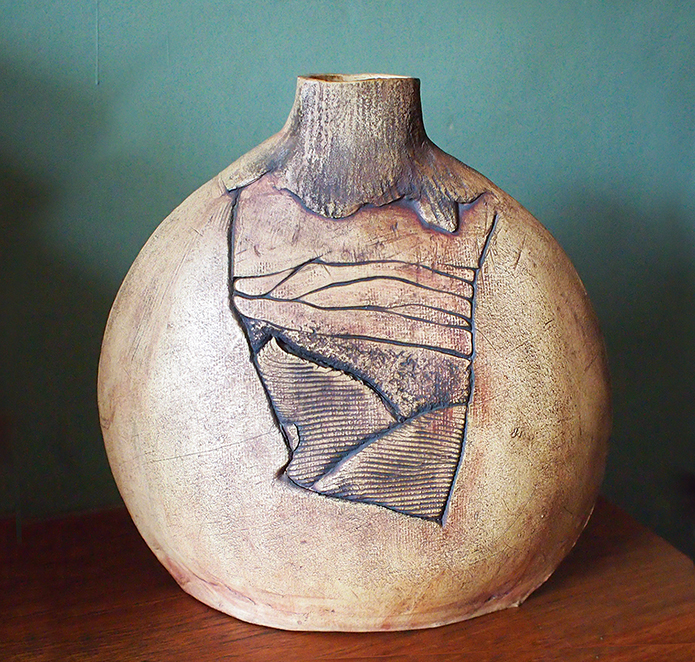
Early Clarecraft: Landscape pot 1999

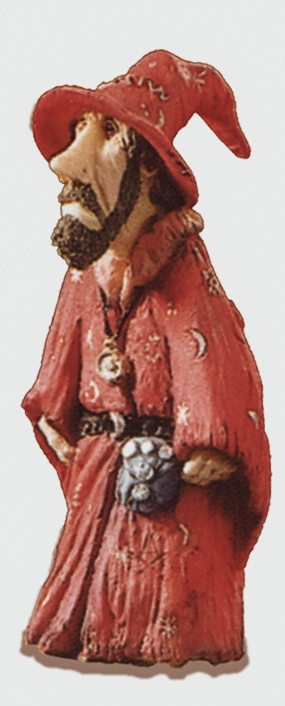
Discworld: Original Rincewind

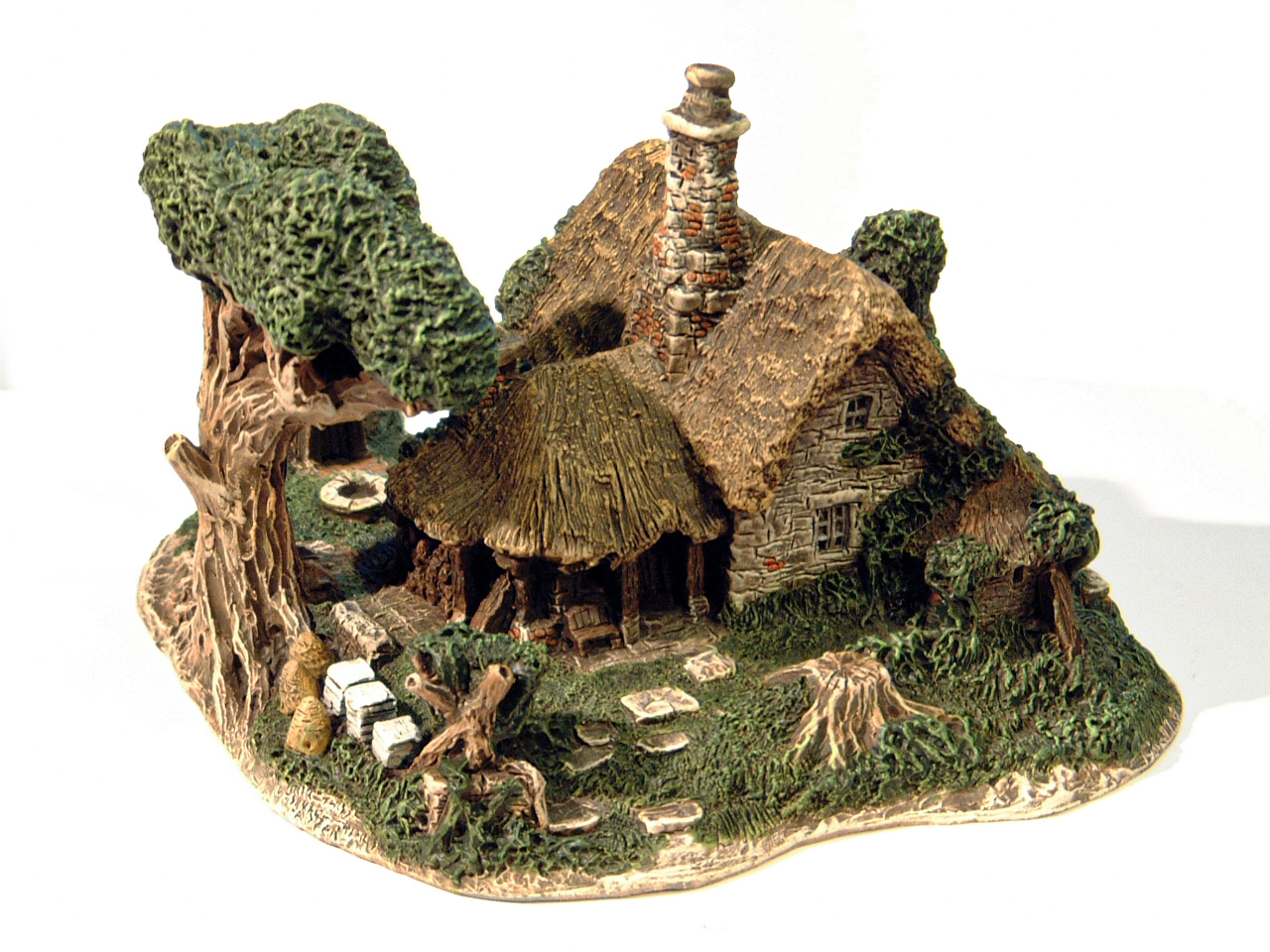
Discworld: Granny's cottage.jpg

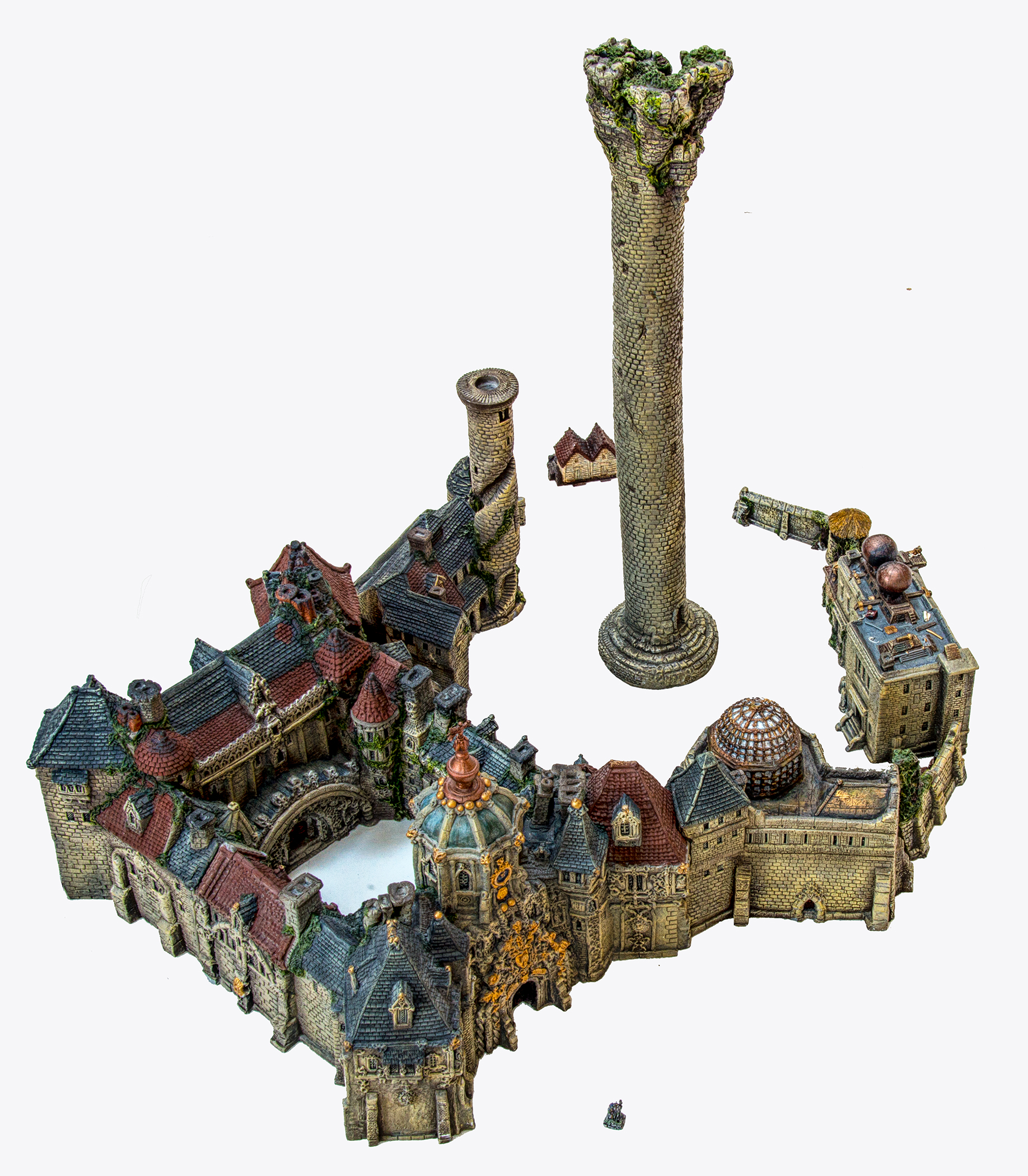
Discworld: The Unseen University

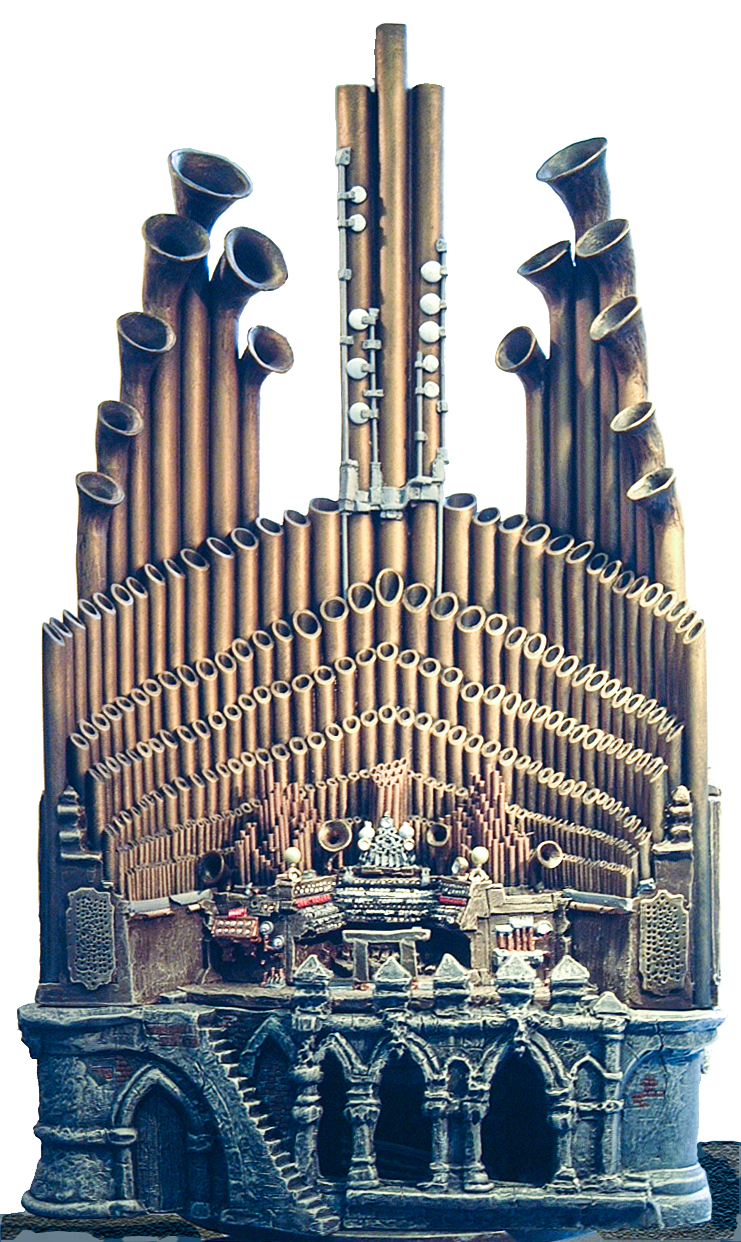
Discworld: The Mighty Organ

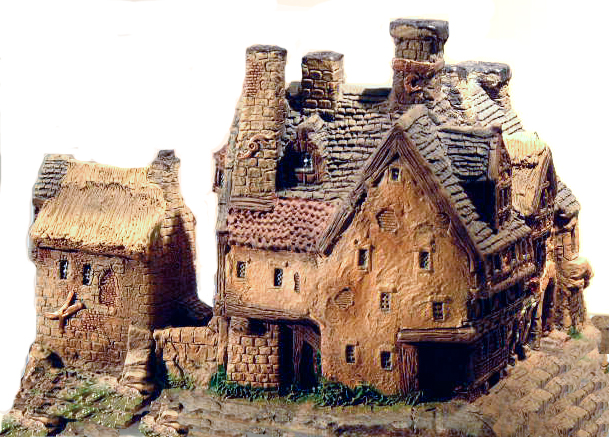
Discworld real estate: The Drum

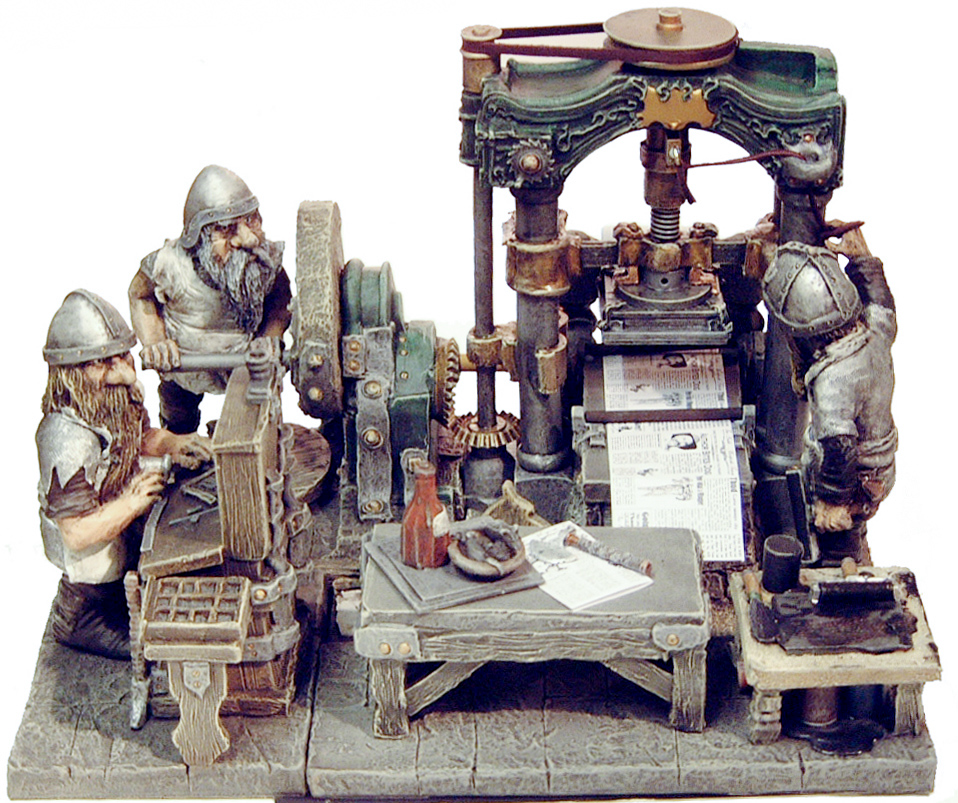
Discworld: The Thunderer

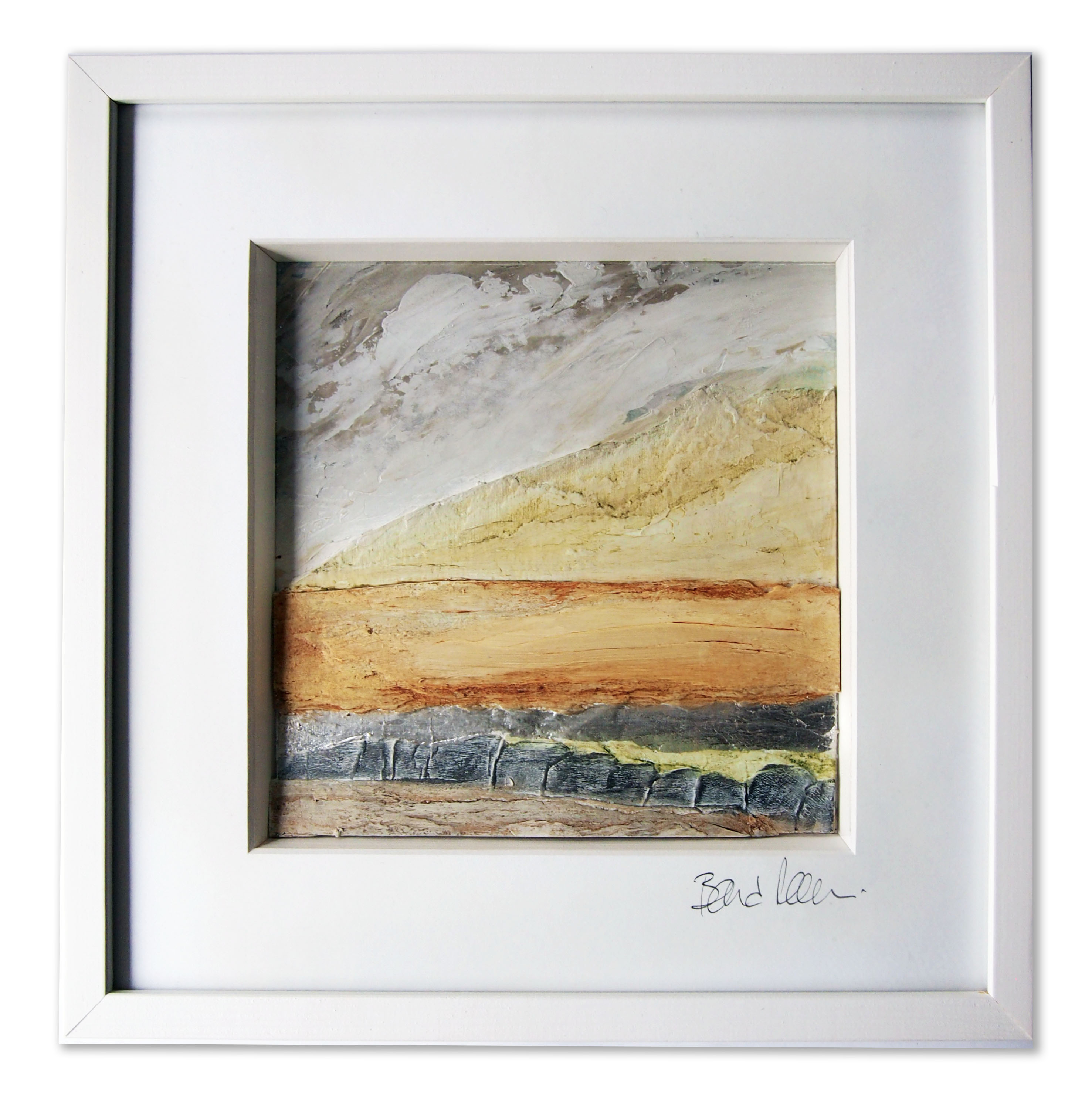
Painting: Landscape study borderlands
