= Josh Kirby =

British writer and illustrator

- Kirby at home
- Born: Ronald William Kirby; 27 November 1928; Waterloo, Lancashire, England
- Died: 23 October 2001 (aged 72); Shelfanger, Norfolk, England
- Education: Liverpool City School of Art
- Known for: Painting, especially book cover art
- Spouse: Dianne Kingston (m. 1965; div. 1982)
- Awards: Best professional science fiction artist at the Annual World Sci-Fi Convention (1979); British Fantasy Award for Professional Artist (1996)

Ronald William "Josh" Kirby (27 November 1928 – 23 October 2001) was a British commercial artist. Over a career spanning 60 years, he was the artist for the covers of many science fiction books including Terry Pratchett's Discworld novels.

== Personal life ==
He was born on 27 November 1928 at 58 Argo Road, Waterloo, Lancashire. His parents were Charles William and Ellen (née Marsh) Kirby who ran a grocery shop together, although his father was also a ship owner's freight clerk. They named him Ronald William Kirby.

Kirby dreamed of a career in art from a young age. When he was seven, he made a trade sign that said "KIRBY – ARTIST". He was also attracted to science fiction and fantasy from images seen in films and magazines.

At the beginning of the Second World War, his school was evacuated to Abercraf in South Wales. In 1943, he returned to Liverpool and attended the Junior then Senior Schools of the Liverpool City School of Art from the age of 14 until he was 20. He was trained in drawing, painting and lithography. While he was there, his Old Master-style portraits earned him the nickname "Josh" when colleagues likened his work to that of the painter Sir Joshua Reynolds. The nickname stuck. He also met the model June Furlong in 1948 and they remained lifelong friends.

He moved to London in 1950. In 1965, he married Dianne Kingston and moved to The Old Rectory, Shelfanger, near Diss in Norfolk. He lived and worked there, in a cramped studio, until his death.

Kirby and Kingston divorced in 1982. He died of natural causes in his sleep at home in Shelfanger at the age of 72 on 23 October 2001 and was survived by his brother Len and two nephews.

In 2024, his family were looking for a philanthropist to support the conservation and exhibition of his body of work, around 400 finished paintings and several hundred sketches.

== Career ==
Full cover art of Equal Rites by Josh Kirby

Detail of the cover art showing Kirby's cameo.

He worked as freelance all his career, having left his only employment after half a day.

After leaving art school, Liverpool City Council commissioned him to paint the Lord Mayor, Alderman Joseph Jackson Cleary, in 1950. Kirby carried out the commission but decided against portraiture as a career and turned to illustration for film posters and books.

In the early 1950s, Kirby illustrated film posters for studios in both London and Paris and continued to do some film posters until the 1980s. In the 1970s, he undertook film poster art for publicity agency feref. Working alongside designer Eddie Paul, Kirby depicted the characters for Star Wars: Return of the Jedi; films The Beastmaster and Krull, among others. He also designed a poster for The Life of Brian inspired by Pieter Brueghel's Tower Of Babel, but it was not used.

When the market for film poster illustration dried up in the mid 1980s, Kirby switched his attention to role-playing games. He provided cover art for Duelmasters, Tunnels & Trolls and Wizards & Warriors.

However, Kirby's major output between the late 1950s to the 1980s was artwork for book covers for a very wide range of books including westerns, crime novels, science fiction and non-fiction, as well as covers and interior art for science fiction magazines. His first published book cover art was for the 1955 science fiction novel Cee-Tee Man, by Dan Morgan. In 1956, he created a cover for Ian Fleming's book Moonraker. Working for publishers including Panther, Corgi, Four Square and NEL/Mayflower, he illustrated over 400 covers for authors including Brian Aldiss, Isaac Asimov, Ray Bradbury, Stephen Briggs, Kenneth Bulmer, Edgar Rice Burroughs, Craig Shaw Gardner, Ron Goulart, Robert Heinlein, Alfred Hitchcock, Jack Kerouac, Ursula Le Guin, Richard Matheson, Guy de Maupassant, Terry Pratchett, Robert Rankin, Jimmy Sangster, Jules Verne, and H. G. Wells.

Kirby's most significant work in the 1980s was the covers for the Discworld series, a commission that Kirby thought would be a "one-off". Starting with The Colour of Magic, he eventually produced the covers for 26 of the series until his death in 2001. Upon his passing, his successor Paul Kidby painted a portrait of Kirby into the cover art of the novel Night Watch, in tribute to the artist.

== Style ==
Throughout his career, Kirby used oils, acrylics, gouache, or watercolor, often using more than one method on a single piece. Ultimately, he preferred oils as they would not dry too quickly and could be manipulated and applied in layers. This allowed them to be retouched or entirely painted over, whatever it took to achieve the result.

When asked about influences, he most often named three past artists. The oldest was Hieronymus Bosch, famous for his fantastic imagery, detailed landscapes and illustrations of religious concepts and narratives; next was Pieter Bruegel, whose religious and mythological depictions expanded the viewer's perspective of reality; and finally muralist Frank Brangwyn, an avant-garde artist-craftsman notable for his boldly coloured murals.

Kirby worked slowly and meticulously. It would take him four to eight weeks to complete a single painting because his process included reading each novel before illustrating it. He would then draw a rough sketch in pencil to be approved by the art editor at the publisher. Unusually, he discussed the concept directly over the phone with Pratchett, rather than his publisher's art director.

== Collections ==
Collections of his work include:

- The Voyage of the Ayeguy (1981), a portfolio of six linked science-fantasy pictures published by Schanes & Schanes
- The Josh Kirby Poster Book (1989), containing 13 posters inspired by Discworld
- ~~Faust~~ Eric (1990), by Terry Pratchett with 15 Kirby illustrations
- In the Garden of Unearthly Delights (1991), a collection of 159 Kirby paintings
- The Josh Kirby Discworld Portfolio (1993)

== Exhibitions ==
- 1986: Hammer Gallery, Berlin
- 1988: Albert Dock, Liverpool
- 1996: Williamson Art Gallery, Birkenhead
- 2007: Retrospective at Walker Art Gallery, Liverpool

== Awards ==
- Best SF Artist (Professional Class), World Science Fiction Convention (1979)
- British Fantasy Award for Professional Artist (1996)
