= Mohamad Al-Khaled Samha =

Abu Bashar (born Mohamad Al-Khaled Samha in 1958) is a Syrian-born imam of the mosque of The Islamic Society in Denmark in Odense, Denmark. He was involved in protests against the Jyllands-Posten cartoons of Muhammad and in the Vollsmose terrorist arrests.

Al-Khaled worked together with Christian priests to put up a display on religions in the municipality building, and participated in a groundbreaking conference between Christian and Muslim leaders in Denmark.

Al-Khaled was one of the imams who travelled to the Middle East with the Akkari-Laban dossier during the Jyllands-Posten Muhammad cartoons controversy. He was part of the first delegation of imams that went to Egypt 3–11 December 2005.

Al-Khaled worked as prison imam at the State Prison in Nyborg until he was fired in July 2006. According to sources at the prison, he was fired after complaints from inmates at Nyborg State Prison that he was inciting hatred of Denmark. Answering to the story in the Folketing, Justice Minister Lene Espersen said he was fired due to cutbacks at the prison.

Al-Khaled knew the Vollsmose terrorists, who lived in his area, though he mentioned in interviews he knew them only as neighbors After their arrest, he confirmed for news reporters that the suspects were Muslims.

According to the Danish newspaper Ekstra Bladet, Youssef Mohamad El Hajdib, one of the suspects arrested for the 2006 German train bombing, had Al-Khaled's phone number saved on his phone. That information gained in importance, when it emerged, that El Hadib was arrested on his way by train to Odense, the city al-Khaled lives in. Al-Khaled denied knowing El Hajdib, and was never charged or asked about this matter by the Danish or the German police, and it was never confirmed that El Hajdib had his number.

In September 2014, Al-Khaled gave a lecture at an Islamic Society in Denmark-run mosque and said "[Jews are the] offspring of apes and pigs". This resulted in a two-week suspended prison sentence.
