= Ahmad Abu Laban =

Ahmad Abu Laban (Arabic: أحمد أبو لبن; 1946 – 1 February 2007) was a Danish-Palestinian imam and the leader of the organization The Islamic Society in Denmark. He was a central figure in the Jyllands-Posten Muhammad cartoons controversy.

== Personal life ==
Ahmad Abu Laban was born in 1946 in Jaffa, Mandatory Palestine. In 1948, his family fled to Cairo, Egypt, and he grew up there. In 1969, he graduated as a mechanical engineer. In 1974, he married his great cousin Inam; the couple had seven children. He studied Islamic theology with scholars in different Muslim countries. He was employed in the Persian Gulf oil industry from 1970 to 1982 and then worked for a contracting company in Nigeria from 1982 to 1984. He contributed to Islamic projects in education in different states of Nigeria.

He emigrated to Denmark in 1984 and lived there for the rest of his life. He publicly denounced terrorism and the use of violence to further the Islamic cause. Moreover, he was known to fight for social justice and help alleviate social ills, by preaching that Danish Muslims had a responsibility to better the society in which they were a part. On 19 January 2007, The Islamic Society in Denmark announced that Abu Laban had fast spreading cancer and that it was probably lung cancer. Abu Laban died on 1 February 2007, aged 60.

At the time of his death, Abu Laban worked as a religious advisor with The Islamic Society in Denmark. According to the organization's website, he was a member of the "Co-ordination council of Imams" in Europe.

== Controversy ==
Ahmad Abu-Laban has been declared persona non grata in the United Arab Emirates and Egypt because of his Islamist views. He had been a well-known figure in the Danish media for his often radical statements about Islam and the integration of immigrants into the Danish society.

Sri Lankan researcher Rohan Gunaratna, author of the book Inside Al Qaeda, has characterised Ahmed Abu Laban as an Islamic extremist. Gunaratna also accused Abu Laban of giving political and economic support to the Egyptian Islamist movement al-Gama'a al-Islamiyya, which is considered as a terrorist organization by the United States and European Union.

=== Muhammad cartoons controversy ===
Ahmad Abu-Laban became involved in the media crisis which erupted in Denmark after the issue of the Muhammad cartoons in the conservative newspaper Jyllands-Posten. In November 2005, he was one of the leaders of a delegation that toured the Middle East to ask for diplomatic support, one of the factors that sparked the widespread anger in the region in early 2006. Along with Akhmed Akkari, he authored the Akkari-Laban dossier which was used on that tour.

Three additional images - allegedly sent to Ahmad Abu-Laban but never published - were added to the list of cartoons actually published in the dossier handed out during this tour. Ahmad Akkari has explained that the three drawings had been added to "give an insight in how hateful the atmosphere in Denmark is towards Muslims."

=== Other controversial comments and citations ===
- In his Friday sermon immediately following the September 11 attacks, he preached that "[he mourned the victims] with dry tears".
- Responding to Theo van Gogh's murder, his response was publicly to criticise it. Not long after, he criticized the European abuse of free speech for the issue of the controversial film Submission of the murdered Dutch filmmaker.
- When Amina Lawal from Nigeria was condemned to stoning, he refused to condemn the sentencing, considering he is not a judge and know not much about the episode.
- After a gang killing in Copenhagen, Abu Laban proposed to deter any vengeance killing by the payment of a sum of "blood money" amounting to DKR. 200,000 – or the equivalent of 100 camels, according to his calculation, in today's currency, to prevent any revenge.
- "I call these people rats in holes" was his characterisation of the Danish liberal politician Naser Khader.
- In his Friday prayers on 5 April 2002, Abu Laban called on his congregation to offer their lives in a jihad for the Palestinian cause. Outside the mosque buses were waiting to take the congregants to a demonstration at Parliament Square, where they held up signs equating the Israelis with the Nazis, and burned the Israeli flag.
