= International reactions to the Jyllands-Posten Muhammad cartoons controversy =

Reactions to the publication of satirical cartoons

Danish newspaper Jyllands-Posten's publication of satirical cartoons of the Islamic prophet Muhammad on September 30, 2005, led to violence, arrests, inter-governmental tension, and debate about the scope of free speech and the place of Muslims in the West. Many Muslims stressed that the image of Muhammad is blasphemous, while many Westerners defended the right of free speech. A number of governments, organizations, and individuals have issued statements defining their stance on the protests or cartoons.

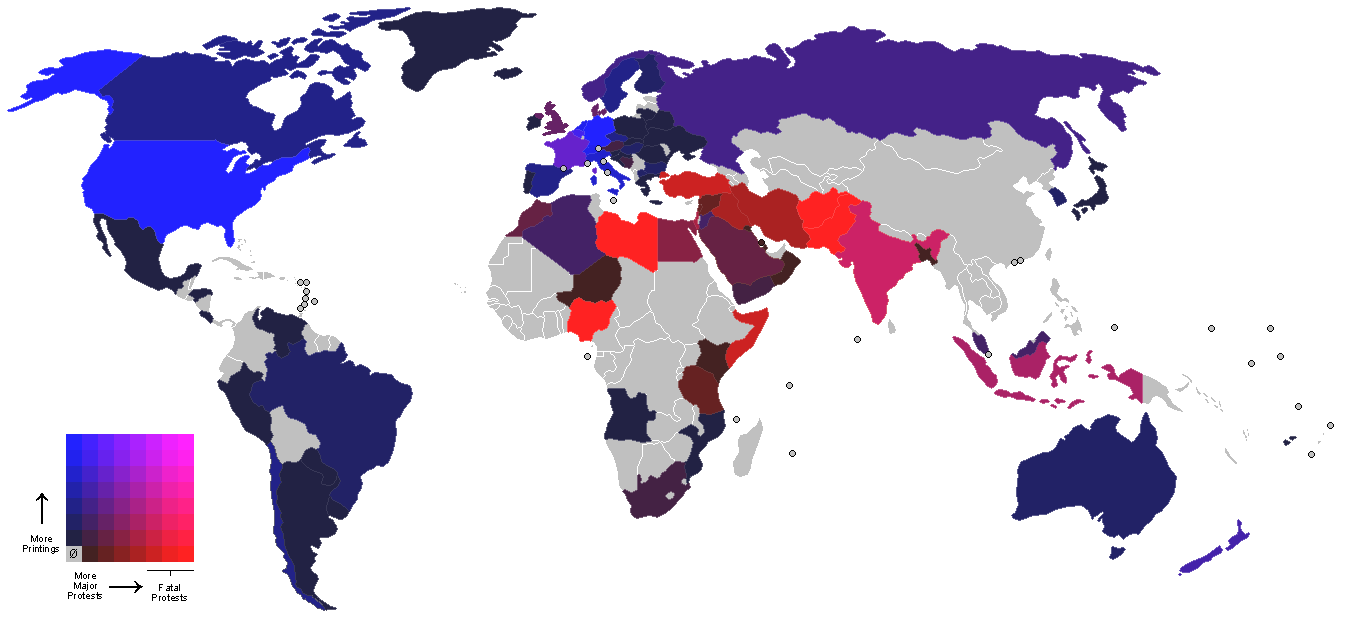
Map showing republication of the cartoons (blue) and major boycotts and protests in response (red)

== Political reactions ==
=== International organisations ===
- United Nations: On February 13, 2006, Doudou Diène, United Nations (UN) Special Rapporteur on contemporary forms of racism, racial discrimination, xenophobia, and related intolerance reported:

Legally, the Government of every State party to the International Covenant on Civil and Political Rights is bound by three articles dealing with the relationship between freedom of religion and freedom of opinion and expression, namely article 18, which protects freedom of religion, subject to such limitations as are necessary to protect public safety and order or the fundamental rights and freedoms of others (art. 18, para. 3); article 19, which protects freedom of expression and opinion, subject to certain restrictions such as "respect of the rights or reputations of others" (art. 19, para. 3 (a)); and article 20, which states that any advocacy of national, racial or religious hatred that constitutes incitement to discrimination, hostility or violence shall be prohibited by law.

The secretary-general of the UN, Kofi Annan, asked the Western media to be more sensitive in its handling of religious themes and use of peaceful dialogue after being asked by the secretary-general of the Arab League, Amr Mussa.

- European Union (EU): José Manuel Barroso, the president of the European Commission, supported the Danish government and said that freedom of speech cannot be compromised: "It's better to publish too much than not to have freedom.."

On January 30, 2006, the European Union said that any retaliatory boycott of Danish goods would violate world trade rules.

On February 15, 2006, the European Parliament accepted a resolution which condemns all violence arising from the publication of the cartoons. It stated that the EU stands in solidarity with Denmark and all other countries that have been affected by the violence. It also stated that Muslims may be offended by the cartoons and that they have the right to protest peacefully, but that the freedom of speech is absolute and may not be affected by any form of censorship.

- Organisation of the Islamic Conference (OIC): The OIC member states held a meeting in Jeddah on February 14, 2006, to discuss the publication of the cartoons. The ambassadors felt that the reaction of the Danish authorities on the issue was "under par" compared to the reaction of other European states which condemned the publication of the cartoons and considered it as a provocation and an incitement to hatred. The member states approved a five-point plan which OIC Secretary General Ekmeleddin Ihsanoglu had proposed to Javier Solana on February 7, 2006. The plan called for:

1. the European Union to adopt legislative measures against Islamophobia;
2. the OIC and the EU to work towards a UN Resolution on the lines of the existing UN Resolution 60/150 (Combating defamation of religions) which should prohibit defamation of all prophets and faiths;
3. the European media to adopt a code of ethics;
4. the United Nations to adopt an International Communication Media Order covering a definition of freedom of speech in case of religious symbols;
5. the inclusion of a paragraph prohibiting blasphemy, defamation of religions and incitement to hatred in the text of the Human Rights Council resolution presently being negotiated.

On January 1, 2006, the OIC boycotted a project called "Images of the Middle East" which was to be organized by the Danish Center for Culture and Development and partially financed by the Danish government. The press release mentioned that the Third Extraordinary Session of the Islamic Summit Conference addressed this issue and stressed "the responsibility of all governments to ensure full respect of all religions and religious symbols, stating that the freedom of expression does not justify in any way whatsoever the defamation of religions."

On January 28, 2006, Ihsanoglu called for "Muslims to stay calm and peaceful in the wake of sacrilegious depiction of Prophet Muhammad which has deeply hurt their feelings".

=== Nations ===
- Bahrain: Bahrain's parliament demanded an apology from the government, as well as from Denmark's head of state, the Danish king, and was unaware that Denmark's head of state is Queen Margrethe II.

MPs called for an extraordinary session of parliament to discuss the cartoons, while protesters set Danish dairy products and bacon ablaze. Al-Menbar Islamic Society MP Mohammed Khaled has demanded that Arab leaders take action: "We are stunned by the silence of the Arab leaders. They don't tolerate any criticism against them, yet allow others to insult the Prophet."

- Bangladesh: Foreign Minister Morshed Khan stated before parliament that a diplomatic protest was lodged with the government of Denmark on November 7, 2005. He also requested the Danish government issue an apology and urged them to prevent further occurrences of "such heinous acts".
- Belarus: On January 18, 2008, an editor of an independent newspaper who reproduced cartoons of Muhammad was jailed for three years.
- Bosnia and Herzegovina: On February 8, 2006, Muslims in Sarajevo organized a protest against the cartoons. They delivered a letter demanding an apology for the publication of the cartoons to staff at the Danish, Norwegian and French embassies. The flags of Norway, Denmark and Croatia were burnt.
- Canada: Canadian prime minister Stephen Harper issued a statement on February 14, 2006, that said Canadians have the right to free speech as well as the right to voice their opinions about the free speech of others. He said that he "regretted" that several Canadian newspapers had chosen to run the cartoons after the controversy began. "While we understand this issue is divisive, our government wishes that people be respectful of the beliefs of others." Harper also commended the Canadian Muslim community for voicing its opinion peacefully, respectfully and democratically.
- Czech Republic: After Iran sent a formal strong objection to the Czech government against the publication of the cartoons in MF DNES and Hospodářské noviny, the newspapers insisted that it was necessary for them to publish the pictures so that the readers get the full information. The Czech foreign minister, Cyril Svoboda, called the Muslim reaction "exaggerated" and advocated a united European stand on the issue.
- Egypt: In December 2005, Muhammad Sayyid Tantawy, the grand imam of Al-Azhar Mosque and grand sheikh of Al-Azhar University, issued a statement saying that "Al-Azhar intends to protest these anti-Prophet cartoons with the UN's concerned committees and human rights groups around the world."

A poll of 1,000 Egyptians in October 2006 revealed that Denmark's image as an enemy to the Egyptian people remained in place. 60% of those polled viewed that Denmark was hostile to Egypt.

- Finland: In February, Finnish Minister of Foreign Affairs Erkki Tuomioja said that Denmark should have acted earlier and paid more attention to Muslim outrage over the offensive caricatures. He added that the Danish government could apologise for the fact that religious feelings were offended, without endangering freedom of expression. The party of indigenous Finnish Muslims, the Finnish Islamic Party, said that it had issued a statement to the media that it condemns the republication of the caricatures and that "We also condemn the Danish government for not interfering in issues that causes confrontation between Islamic world and non-Islamic world. Reissuing the caricatures will cause widely spread agitation because things that Muslims hold sacred have been insulted. Therefore The Finnish Islamic Party exhorts to boikot Danish products everywhere."

Police opened investigations into the publication of the cartoons by the Suomen Sisu group. In Finland it is illegal to "disturb religious peace". This law is rarely prosecuted, which gave the incident nationwide attention. The cartoons have been published on numerous Finnish web sites but not in mainstream media. Police declined to comment which site or sites are being investigated, and said any media that publishes the cartoons will be similarly investigated.

On February 24, 2006, Kaltio, a culture magazine in northern Finland, got publicity for publishing a cartoon of a masked Muhammad which lampooned Finnish political elites' reactions during the cartoon debate.

- France: On February 6, 2006, the French prime minister, Dominique de Villepin, condemned the violence that had occurred internationally in response to the cartoons, but called for tolerance and respect toward other faiths.

The French foreign minister supported the right to free press, but added that it must be used "in a spirit of tolerance and with respect for beliefs and religions".

Nicolas Sarkozy, then interior minister and presidential candidate, said on LCI television that he "preferred an excess of caricature to an excess of censorship" and pointed out that it is, if necessary, up to the courts to judge whether caricatures go beyond what is reasonable to publish, and not to the governments of Muslim countries.

- Germany: Chancellor Angela Merkel said that while she understands that feelings were hurt by the caricatures, violent reactions were unacceptable. She stressed the central role of freedom of expression, and called for dialogue. "Denmark must not feel let alone in this issue". Merkel also said that she understands this to be the common position of the EU.
- Indonesia: President Susilo Bambang Yudhoyono says the Indonesian government condemned the publication of the caricatures. He said that "[t]he publication of the caricature of course reflects a lack of sensitivity to the views and belief of other religious adherents", but recommended to "religious people" that they "accept the apology".
- Iran: Former Iranian president and theorist of Dialogue Among Civilizations, Mohammad Khatami, strongly criticized the Danish cartoons for "spreading hatred", but added that the Muslim world is not entirely blameless either:

Offending and insulting, is different from expressing an opinion that can be analyzed, argued on, and can eventually be accepted or rejected [therefore offending others is not acceptable] ... But in addition to the west, we ourselves also have problems in this regard. Instead of logical criticism or debate, we only keep saying offensive things about liberalism, democracy and modernism. I had told some of our elders before, that the religion of the today's world is 'liberalism' and we have no right to make insults about it. We should not keep using phrases such as "the corrupt culture of the west" etc. in our words. As it's also said in the Koran, "Do not insult the gods of others, otherwise you are indirectly insulting your God".

There was a recommendation for the term for a Danish pastry to be changed to "Gole Mohammadi" (in Persian: Mohammadi Flower). Iran amended §224-1 of its penal code (prohibition of apostasy, magic and religious innovation, punishable by death, no evidence or witness testimony required - only "the judge's views and impressions") to also cover defamation of Muhammed.

- Iraq: Shia cleric Ali al-Sistani condemned the cartoons but also commented about militants who discredit Islam by their acts. Sistani underlined how un-Islamic acts of extremism are used as justification to attack Islam.
- Ireland: Irish president Mary McAleese condemned the cartoons as designed to provoke, designed to be rude and designed to inflame. She also condemned the violent protests against the cartoons.
- Italy: On February 14, Italy's Reform Minister Roberto Calderoli had T-shirts made emblazoned with cartoons of Muhammad in a move likely to embarrass Prime Minister Silvio Berlusconi's government. Calderoli, a member of the anti-immigrant Northern League party, told Ansa news agency on Tuesday that the West had to stand up against Islamic extremists and offered to hand out T-shirts to anyone who wanted them.
- Lebanon: The Lebanese minister of foreign affairs criticised the drawings saying that freedom of speech ends when sacred values are offended.
- Libya: Libya recalled its ambassador and announced that it would close its embassy in Denmark.
- Malaysia: Malaysian prime minister and chairman of Organisation of the Islamic Conference, Abdullah Ahmad Badawi, said: "This is a deliberate act of provocation. They should cease and desist from doing so."
- Nigeria: On February 7, the parliament of the Kano State in the Muslim north of the country cancelled a €23 million order for Danish buses and banned the sale of all Danish and Norwegian products. Legislators then burned the flags of both nations before a crowd decried the "blasphemous caricatures". There were fatalities during the clashes between rioters and police, with estimates ranging from 16 to more than 100.
- Pakistan: Pakistan's ambassador urged the Danish prime minister to penalize the cartoonists. From February 14 to 15 protests occurred, the largest of which took place in Peshawar, where protesters numbered over 70,000.
- Russia: The president of the Institute of the Middle East, Yevgeny Satanovsky, told Itar-Tass on February 6 that "The caricatures of Prophet Mohammad published as far back as last September angered the entire Islamic world but especially the countries where Iran's influence is the strongest, and the apex of the conflict coincided precisely with the discussion of the Iranian nuclear dossier at the International Atomic Energy Agency." This theory is echoed by Scientific Council of the Moscow Carnegie Centre member, Alexei Malashenko, who believes that "the fuss around the caricatures was made artificially." That is, at a time when the Muslim world has no concerted position either on the Iranian nuclear program or Hamas, whose ideology is opposed by moderate Islamic regimes, the caricature uproar provides a "pretext for showing how coherent Muslims are."
- Saudi Arabia: On January 26, 2006, Saudi Arabia withdrew its ambassadors.
- Singapore: The Islamic Religious Council of Singapore issued a statement that said "the inciting of hatred against a faith of a people is very unfortunate," and that "[they] are fortunate and deeply appreciative that in Singapore, the media and the community at large have always been mindful of sensitivities… and have helped to promote racial and religious harmony across society." Foreign Minister George Yeo and the Minister-in-charge of Muslim Affairs Yaacob Ibrahim said that the incident showed the need to respect racial and religious sensitivities, have a "responsible media", and to cultivate good inter-religious relations and confidence beyond just legislation. Later, Prime Minister Lee Hsien Loong said that the publication of the cartoons depicting Muhammad was provocative and wrong, but he expressed objection to violent responses.
- Spain: El Periodico published the cartoons on February 1, 2007.
- Sweden: On February 5, Swedish Minister of Foreign Affairs, Laila Freivalds said in an interview: "We support the freedom of speech, that I think is very clear. But at the same time it is important to say that with this freedom comes a certain responsibility, and it could be objectionable to act in a way that insults people."

The nationalist party Swedish Democrats (Sverigedemokraterna) started a competition to draw cartoons of Muhammad on their website. After words of exhortation from the Swedish government, and in particular from the minister of foreign affairs, Laila Freivalds, the website was shut down. When the story caught wider attention, Freivalds resigned as minister for having interfered with press freedom.

- Turkey: Prime Minister Recep Tayyip Erdoğan said: "Caricatures of Prophet Muhammad are an attack against our spiritual values. There should be a limit of freedom of press."
- United Arab Emirates: Justice and Islamic Affairs Minister Mohammed Al Dhaheri called the publication of the cartoon "cultural terrorism, not freedom of expression".
- United Kingdom: British Foreign Secretary Jack Straw criticised European newspapers for republishing the cartoons: "There is freedom of speech, we all respect that ... But there is not any obligation to insult or to be gratuitously inflammatory. I believe that the republication of these cartoons has been unnecessary. It has been insensitive. It has been disrespectful and it has been wrong." Straw praised British newspapers for their "considerable responsibility and sensitivity" in not printing the cartoons.
- United States: The U.S. government issued a statement saying: "We all fully recognize and respect freedom of the press and expression but it must be coupled with press responsibility. Inciting religious or ethnic hatreds in this manner is not acceptable." A State Department spokesman said that the images were offensive, but added that the U.S. also supports the rights of individuals to express their freely held views and that it is not for the government to dictate what is printed in the media.

In the U.S. State Department's daily briefing for February 3, official spokesman Sean McCormick said: "Our response is to say that while we certainly don't agree with, support, or in some cases, we condemn the views that are aired in public that are published in media organizations around the world, we, at the same time, defend the right of those individuals to express their views. For us, freedom of expression is at the core of our democracy and it is something that we have shed blood and treasure around the world to defend and we will continue to do so. ... So we would urge all parties to exercise the maximum degree of understanding, the maximum degree of tolerance when they talk about this issue. And we would urge dialogue, not violence. And that also those that might take offense at these images that have been published, when they see similar views or images that could be perceived as anti-Semitic or anti-Catholic, that they speak out with equal vigor against those images."

Former U.S. president Bill Clinton spoke in Qatar and strongly criticized the Danish cartoons, comparing historical anti-Semitism in Europe with anti-Islamic feeling today: "So now what are we going to do? ... Replace the anti-Semitic prejudice with anti-Islamic prejudice?"

- Vatican City: The Vatican issued a statement saying "The right to freedom of thought and expression, sanctioned by the Declaration of the Rights of Man, cannot imply the right to offend the religious sentiment of believers. This principle applies obviously for any religion."
- Yemen: A court in Yemen sentenced a newspaper editor to a year in jail for reprinting Danish cartoons depicting Muhammad.

== Violent protests ==
=== Deaths ===
- At least four protesters were killed in Afghanistan, in Mihtarlam and a US air base in Bagram. One boy was trampled to death in Bossaso, Somalia, when the crowd stampeded. On February 5, 2006, one protester died at the Danish embassy in Beirut, Lebanon.
- On February 6, 2006, one demonstrator involved in the torching of the Danish consulate in Beirut, Lebanon, was found dead on a staircase. One protester was shot to death in Laghman Province, Afghanistan.
- Four people were killed and 22 injured on February 7, 2006, in an attack on a NATO base in Maymana, Afghanistan.
- Andrea Santoro, a Catholic priest, was killed on February 5, 2006, in Trabzon, Turkey. A 16-year-old high school student carrying a 9mm pistol was arrested two days later. The student told police he had been influenced by the cartoons.
- On February 13, 2006, two people were killed in Lahore, Pakistan. The next day two were killed in Peshawar, Pakistan, and another in Lahore.
- On February 17, 2006, 11 people died during protests in Libya.
- On February 18, 2006, 16 people were killed in northern Nigeria as demonstrators protested the cartoons by storming and burning Christian churches and businesses.
- As of February 24, 2006, around 146 people were killed in religious riots in Nigeria as a result of attacks against Christians in the predominantly Muslim North.
- As of April 14, 2006, a 67-year-old Coptic Christian was knifed to death by a 25-year-old Muslim in a Coptic church in Alexandria, Egypt. At the same time others attacked two other Coptic churches and injured more than ten Christians. According to press reports, referring to the department of the Interior of Egypt, the killer acted in revenge to the publication of the Muhammad cartoons.
- On May 3, 2006, 28-year-old Pakistani Amir Abdur Rehman Cheema hanged himself in prison in Berlin, Germany, while awaiting trial for an unsuccessful attempt to attack the chief editor of the German newspaper Die Welt with a knife. At his autopsy, two high-ranking Pakistani police officials were present.

=== Demonstrations and riots ===
Demonstrations against the cartoons took place in several predominantly or partially Muslim countries, including the Philippines and Indonesia. A prominent feature of many of these demonstrations was burning the flags of Denmark, France, and Norway. The Swiss flag was also burned at some protests. At some of these protests, many American, British, and Israeli flags were also burned. In addition to burning, some demonstrators walked on Danish flags or tore them up. Since the Danish flag incorporates a cross, desecrating a Danish flag can be seen as both anti-Danish and anti-Christian. An interview in the Russian media asserts that a US newspaper made the cartoons, and that Jyllands-Posten only distributed it.

The controversy produced labour strikes and protests in Pakistan and mass demonstrations in Baghdad, Iraq. In the Palestinian territories, thousands of people participated in demonstrations and gunmen in the Gaza Strip threatened violence against any Scandinavians in the area. The European Union's Gaza offices were raided by 15 masked gunmen from the al-Aqsa Martyrs' Brigades. They demanded apologies from Denmark and Norway, but left 30 minutes later without any shots being fired or injuries caused.

On February 2, Palestinian gunmen shut down the EU headquarters in Gaza in protest of the Jyllands-Posten drawings. According to CNN, "Masked members of the militant groups Palestinian Islamic Jihad and Al Aqsa Martyrs Brigades, the armed wing of the Palestinians' former ruling party, Fatah, fired bullets into the air, and a man read the group's demands. ... The gunmen left a notice on the EU office's door that the building would remain closed until Europeans apologize to Muslims, many of whom consider the cartoons offensive."

On February 6, at least four demonstrators in Afghanistan were shot by riot police, while taking part in an assault on the Bagram Airbase outside Kabul, and another two died in Mihtarlam.

As of February 24, at least 150 people, most of them Nigerian, had died in the protests.

=== Death threats ===
In response to the publication of the drawings, the UK Islamist group Al Ghurabaa published an article on their website called "Kill those who insult the Prophet Muhammad". The article states, "The insulting of the Messenger Muhammad is something that the Muslims cannot and will not tolerate and the punishment in Islam for the one who does so is death. This is the sunnah of the prophet and the verdict of Islam upon such people, one that any Muslim is able execute." Al Ghurabaa organised the February 3 protest march from London Central Mosque to the Danish Embassy where protesters waved placards reading, "Butcher those who mock Islam", "Kill those who insult Islam", "Europe you will pay, your 9/11 is on the way", or "7/7 is on its way", "Europe you will pay, Bin Laden is on his way", and "Europe you'll come crawling, when the Mujahideen come roaring". Despite the similar theme on Al Ghurabaa's website, their spokesman, Anjem Choudary, said he did not know who wrote the placards. MPs from all parties condemned the protest, calling the Metropolitan Police to pursue those responsible on the grounds that the threats were an incitement to murder.

=== Churches ===
On January 29 six churches in the Iraqi cities of Baghdad and Kirkuk were targeted by car bombs, killing 13-year-old worshipper Fadi Raad Elias. No militants claimed to be retaliating for the pictures, nor was it the first time Iraqi churches have been bombed, but the church's bishop stated that "[t]he church blasts were a reaction to the cartoons published in European papers. But Christians are not responsible for what is published in Europe." Many Assyrians in Iraq felt like "Westerners should not give wild statements [as] everyone can attack us [in response]" and said things like "Today I'm afraid to walk the streets, because I'm Christian." On February 5, thousands of Muslims in Lebanon surrounded the Maronite Catholic Church and threw stones at it.

On February 6, an Italian Catholic priest named Andrea Santoro was reported to have been shot dead at the door-step of his church in the Black Sea port city Trabzon. The convict, arrested on February 7 was a Turkish Muslim youth aged 16, who told the public attorney that his action was motivated by cartoons protests.

Also on February 6, leaflets were distributed in Ramadi, Iraq, by the militant group "The Military Wing for the Army of Justice" demanding Christians to "halt their religious rituals in churches and other worship places because they insulted Islam and Muslims."

On February 18, 2006, eleven churches, as well as several Christian-owned businesses, in northern Nigeria were burned by protesters.

=== Fatwa ===
Also on January 29, a Muslim cleric in Mosul issued a fatwa stating, "Expel the Crusaders and infidels from the streets, schools, and institutions because they have offended the person of the prophet." It has been reported that Muslim students beat up a Christian student at Mosul University in response to the fatwa on the same day. On February 2, some Palestinians in the West Bank handed out a leaflet signed by Islamic Jihad stating, "Churches in Gaza could come under attack".

The Danish government announced that a fatwa had been declared against the Danish troops stationed in Iraq. The government responded by heightening security for its troops.

=== Burning embassies ===
On February 4, the Danish and Norwegian embassies in Damascus, Syria, were set on fire, after being stormed by an angry mob. Within the building housing the Danish embassy were the Chilean and Swedish embassies, both having no formal connection to the present row. As it was a holiday, the building was unoccupied. As a response to this incident, the Danish and Norwegian Ministries of Foreign Affairs issued a warning, urging their citizens in Syria to leave the country immediately. The German Cultural Centre in Gaza was raided by Palestinian students.

On October 19, ten ambassadors from Islamic countries, including Algeria, Bosnia-Herzegovina, Egypt, Indonesia, Iran, Morocco, Pakistan, Libya, Saudi Arabia, and Turkey, as well as the head of the Palestinian delegation in Denmark, sent a letter to Prime Minister Anders Fogh Rasmussen requesting a meeting and asking him to distance himself from hate speech, including remarks by MP Louise Frevert, Culture Minister of Denmark Brian Mikkelsen, and the Radio Holger station. Rasmussen declined, saying that the government could not interfere with the right to free speech, but said that cases of blasphemy and discrimination could be tried before the courts, a reaction seen as a snub by the Muslims.

=== Nordic countries ===
On January 10, a marginal Norwegian Christian magazine, Magazinet, printed the drawings after getting authorization from Jyllands-Posten. Major newspapers in Norway had printed facsimiles from Jyllands-Posten and reproduced all the caricatures in their online versions; a few days earlier, the Swedish newspaper Expressen had printed two of the drawings in conjunction with an article discussing the event.

A Norwegian man made a threat against the lives of the people at the magazine, but later claimed, when faced by the police, that it was just a prank. The Norwegian Foreign Ministry sent a letter to their ambassadors in the Middle East stating that one of the pillars of the Norwegian society is freedom of speech, but they expressed regret that Magazinet did not respect Muslims' beliefs.

On January 30, Palestinian groups demanded that all Scandinavians leave the Palestinian territories immediately. On January 30, an Islamic organisation, the Mujahedeen Army, called for militant attacks against "all available targets" in Denmark and Norway.
