= La Pourcailhade =

Coordinates: 43.3222°N 0.3711°E

La Pourcailhade (also known as La Fete du Cochon or Festival of the Pig) was a pig festival that was held each year in August in the town of Trie-sur-Baïse, in the Hautes-Pyrénées department of south-western France. It was first held in 1975 and was organised by La Confrérie du Cochon or the Brotherhood of the Pig. The festival involved displays, pig races, eating contests and other competitions. The most popular competition was "Le Championnat de France du Cri de Cochon" ("French Pig-Squealing Championships"), in which contestants had to imitate the noises pigs make at various stages in their life.

It once featured on the Channel 4 television programme Eurotrash. The contest achieved international notoriety in 2005 when a photo of one of the contestants Jacques Barrot was modified and portrayed as an attempt to ridicule Muhammad in the Akkari-Laban dossier produced by two imams who had been granted sanctuary in Denmark but were upset by the publication of 12 cartoons of Muhammad in the Jyllands-Posten newspaper. The dossier was used as false evidence of anti-Muslim feeling in Denmark in several tours of Arab countries by the imams and others in an attempt to inflame passions about the Jyllands-Posten cartoons.
