= New Centre-Left =

Denmark political party

Logo of New Centre-Left

New Centre-Left (Danish: Nyt Centrum-Venstre) is a political party in Denmark. It was founded in June 2020 by party leader Hanna Ziadeh together with Jens Baj and former imam, Ahmed Akkari. The party supports a strong welfare state and is critical of religious influence in Denmark.

In November 2022, the party wrote on Facebook that it came nowhere near gathering the necessary number of nominators (to stand in a parliamentary election), and that it had effectively gone into hibernation.
