= Jyllands-Posten Muhammad cartoons controversy =

2005 controversy surrounding the depiction of Muhammad

The controversial cartoons of Muhammad, as they were first published in Jyllands-Posten in September 2005. The headline, Muhammeds ansigt, means "The face of Muhammad".

The Jyllands-Posten Muhammad cartoons controversy (or Muhammad cartoons crisis, Danish: Muhammed-krisen) began after the Danish newspaper Jyllands-Posten published twelve editorial cartoons on 30 September 2005 depicting Muhammad, the prophet of Islam, in what it said was a response to the debate over criticism of Islam and self-censorship. Muslim groups in Denmark complained, sparking protests around the world, including violence and riots in some Muslim countries.

Islam has a strong tradition of aniconism, and it is considered blasphemous by the majority of Muslims to visually depict Muhammad. This, compounded with a sense that the cartoons insulted Muhammad and Islam, offended many Muslims. Danish Muslim organisations petitioned the embassies of countries and the Danish government to take action and filed a judicial complaint against the newspaper, which was dismissed in January 2006. After the Danish government refused to meet with diplomatic representatives of the Muslim countries and—per legal principle and in accordance with the Danish legal system—would not intervene in the case, a number of Danish imams headed by Ahmed Akkari met in late 2005 to submit the Akkari-Laban dossier. The dossier presented the twelve Jyllands-Posten cartoons and other depictions of Muhammad, some real and some fake, including one where they claimed he was portrayed as a pig, seen as forbidden and unclean in Islam. This last image was proven to be an Associated Press photograph of a contestant in a pig-squealing contest. Akkari later acknowledged the goal of the delegation had been to stir up controversy.

The issue received prominent media attention in some Muslim-majority countries, leading to protests across the world in late January and early February 2006. Some escalated into violence, resulting in almost 250 reported deaths (with at least 139 counted), attacks on Danish and other European diplomatic missions, attacks on churches and Christians, and a boycott of Denmark. Some groups responded to the intense pro-aniconist protests by endorsing the Danish policies, launching "Buy Danish" campaigns and other displays of support for freedom of expression. The cartoons were reprinted in certain newspapers around the world, while other media outlets declined to reproduce the images.

Danish prime minister Anders Fogh Rasmussen described the controversy as Denmark's worst international relations incident since the Second World War. The incident came at a time of heightened political and social tensions between Muslim majority countries and Western countries, following several, high-profile radical Islamic terrorist attacks in the West—such as the September 11 attacks and the 7/7 bombings—and Western military interventions in Muslim countries, such as Iraq and Afghanistan. The relationship between Muslims in Denmark and broader society was similarly at a low point, and the conflict came to symbolize the discrepancies and idiosyncrasies between the Islamic community and the rest of society. In the years since, jihadist terrorist plots claiming to be in retaliation for the cartoons have been planned—and some executed—against targets affiliated with Jyllands-Posten and its employees, Denmark, or newspapers that published the cartoons and other caricatures of Islamic prophets, most notably the Charlie Hebdo shooting in 2015.

Supporters said that the publication of the cartoons was a legitimate exercise in free speech: regardless of the content of the expression, it was important to openly discuss Islam without fear of terror, also stating that the cartoons made important points about critical issues. The Danish tradition of relatively high tolerance for freedom of speech became the focus of some attention. The controversy ignited a debate about the limits of freedom of expression in all societies, religious tolerance and the relationship of Muslim minorities with their broader societies in the West, and relations between the Islamic world in general and the West.

Notably, a few days after the original publishing, Jyllands-Posten published several depictions of Muhammad, all legitimately bought in Muslim countries. This, however, drew little attention.

== Timeline ==
=== Debate about self-censorship ===
On 16 September 2005, Danish news service Ritzau published an article discussing the difficulty encountered by the writer Kåre Bluitgen, who was initially unable to find an illustrator prepared to work on his children's book The Qur'an and the life of the Prophet Muhammad (Danish: Koranen og profeten Muhammeds liv). Three artists declined Bluitgen's proposal out of fear of reprisals.

One artist agreed to assist anonymously; he said that he was afraid for his and his family's safety. According to Bluitgen, one artist declined due to the murder in Amsterdam of the film director Theo van Gogh the year before; another cited the attack in October 2004 on a lecturer at the Carsten Niebuhr Institute at the University of Copenhagen; he was assaulted by five assailants who opposed his reading of the Qur'an to non-Muslims during a lecture. The story gained some traction, and the major Danish newspapers reported the story the following day.

The supposed refusals from these first three artists to participate was seen as evidence of self-censorship out of fear of violence from Islamists, which led to much debate in Denmark. The Danish newspaper Politiken stated on 12 February 2006, that they had asked Bluitgen to put them in touch with the artists, so the claim that none of them dared to work with him could be proved. The author refused, and nobody has ever been able to confirm whether the incident was accurately described.

=== Publication ===
At an editorial meeting of Jyllands-Posten ('The Jutland Post', Denmark's largest daily newspaper) on 19 September, reporter Stig Olesen put forward the idea of asking the members of the newspaper illustrators union if they would be willing to draw Muhammad. This would be an experiment to see the degree to which professional illustrators felt threatened. Flemming Rose, culture editor, was interested in the idea and wrote to the 42 members of the union asking them to draw their interpretations of Muhammad.

15 illustrators responded to the letter. Three declined to participate: one did not know how to contribute to what he called a vague project, one thought the project was stupid and badly paid, and one said he was afraid. Twelve drawings had been submitted—three from newspaper employees and two which did not directly show Muhammad. The editors thought that some of the illustrators who had not responded were employed by other newspapers and were thus contractually prohibited from working for Jyllands-Posten. In the end, editor-in-chief Carsten Juste decided that given its inconclusive results, the story was better suited as an opinion piece rather than a news story, and it was decided to publish it in the culture section, under the direction of editor Flemming Rose.

Peter Hervik, a professor of Migration Studies, has since written that the results of this experiment disproved the idea that self-censorship was a serious problem in Denmark because the overwhelming majority of cartoonists had either responded positively or refused for contractual or philosophical reasons. Carsten Juste has said that the survey "lacked validity and the story fell short of sound journalistic basis." Hervik said that this, along with the fact that the most controversial cartoons were drawn by the newspaper's staff cartoonists, demonstrates that the newspaper's "desire to provoke and insult Danish Muslims exceeded the wish to test the self-censorship of Danish cartoonists."

Rose wrote the editorial which accompanied the cartoons in which he argued there had been several recent cases of self-censorship, weighing freedom of speech against the fear of confronting issues about Islam, so he thought it was a legitimate news story. Among the incidents he cited were: the translators of a book critical of Islam did not want their names published; the Tate gallery in London withdrew an installation by the avant-garde artist John Latham depicting the Quran, Bible and Talmud torn to pieces, and comedian Frank Hvam said in an interview with Jyllands-Posten that he would hypothetically dare to urinate on the Bible on television, but not on the Quran. Rose also mentioned the case of a Danish imam who had met with Prime Minister Anders Fogh Rasmussen and "called on the prime minister to interfere with the press in order to get more positive coverage of Islam."

On 30 September 2005, Jyllands-Posten published an article entitled "Muhammeds ansigt" ('The face of Muhammad') incorporating the cartoons. The article consisted of the 12 cartoons and an explanatory text, in which Rose wrote:

Modern, secular society is rejected by some Muslims. They demand a special position, insisting on special consideration of their own religious feelings. It is incompatible with contemporary democracy and freedom of speech, where one must be ready to put up with insults, mockery and ridicule. It is certainly not always attractive and nice to look at, and it does not mean that religious feelings should be made fun of at any price, but that is of minor importance in the present context. ... we are on our way to a slippery slope where no-one can tell how the self-censorship will end. That is why Morgenavisen Jyllands-Posten has invited members of the Danish editorial cartoonists union to draw Muhammad as they see him.

Later, Rose explained his intent further in The Washington Post: "The cartoonists treated Islam the same way they treat Christianity, Buddhism, Hinduism and other religions. And by treating Muslims in Denmark as equals they made a point: We are integrating you into the Danish tradition of satire because you are part of our society, not strangers. The cartoons are including, rather than excluding, Muslims." The publication of the cartoons was also accompanied by an editorial titled "Truslen fra mørket" ('The Threat from the Darkness') condemning Islamic spiritual leaders "who feel entitled to interpret the prophet's word, and cannot abide the insult that comes from being the object of intelligent satire." In October 2005, Politiken, another leading Danish newspaper, published its own poll of thirty-one of the forty-three members of the Danish cartoonist association. Twenty-three said they would be willing to draw Muhammad. One had doubts, one would not be willing because of fear of possible reprisals, and six artists would not be willing because they respected the Muslim ban on depicting Muhammad.

=== Description of the cartoons ===
The 12 cartoons were drawn by 12 professional cartoonists in Denmark. Four of the cartoons have Danish texts, one deliberately evades the issue and depicts a school child in Denmark named Muhammad rather than the Islamic prophet, one is based on a Danish cultural expression, and one includes a Danish politician.

=== Response ===
The immediate responses to the publication varied, including some newspaper sellers refusing to distribute that day's paper. In the following days, the cartoons received significant attention in other Danish press outlets. According to Jytte Klausen, "most people groaned that the newspaper was at it again, bashing Muslims. The instinct was to split the blame." Berlingske-Tidende criticised the 'gag', but also said that Islam should be openly criticised. Politiken attacked Rose's account of growing self-censorship; it also surveyed Danish cartoonists and said that self-censorship was not generally perceived as a problem. On 4 October, a local teenager telephoned the newspaper offices threatening to kill the cartoonists, but he was arrested after his mother turned him in.

Shortly after the publication, a group of Islamic leaders formed a protest group. Raed Hlayhel called a meeting to discuss their strategy, which took place in Copenhagen a few days after the cartoons appeared. The Islamic Faith Community and four mosques from around the country were represented. The meeting established 19 "action points" to try to influence public opinion about the cartoons. Ahmed Akkari from a mosque in Aarhus was designated the group's spokesman. The group planned a variety of political activities, including launching a legal complaint against the newspaper, writing letters to media outlets inside and outside Denmark, contacting politicians and diplomatic representatives, organising a protest in Copenhagen, and mobilising Danish Muslims through text messages and mosques. A one-day strike and sleep-in were planned, but never took place. A peaceful protest, which attracted about 3,500 demonstrators, was held in Copenhagen on 14 October 2005.

Having received petitions from Danish imams, eleven ambassadors from Muslim-majority countries—Turkey, Saudi Arabia, Iran, Pakistan, Egypt, Indonesia, Algeria, Bosnia and Herzegovina, Libya, Morocco—and the Head of the Palestinian General Delegation asked for a meeting with Danish Prime Minister Anders Fogh Rasmussen on 12 October 2005. They wanted to discuss what they perceived as an "on-going smearing campaign in Danish public circles and media against Islam and Muslims." In a letter, the ambassadors mentioned the issue of the Muhammad cartoons, a recent indictment against Radio Holger, and statements by MP Louise Frevert and the Minister of Culture Brian Mikkelsen. It concluded:

We deplore these statements and publications and urge Your Excellency's government to take all those responsible to task under law of the land in the interest of inter-faith harmony, better integration and Denmark's overall relations with the Muslim world.

— Letter from 11 ambassadors

The government answered with a letter without addressing the request for a meeting:

The freedom of expression has a wide scope and the Danish government has no means of influencing the press. However, Danish legislation prohibits acts or expressions of blasphemous or discriminatory nature. The offended party may bring such acts or expressions to court, and it is for the courts to decide in individual cases.

— A. F. Rasmussen, Official response to ambassadors

The refusal to meet the ambassadors was later prominently criticised by the Danish political opposition, twenty-two Danish ex-ambassadors and the Prime Minister's fellow party member, former Minister of Foreign Affairs Uffe Ellemann-Jensen. Hervik wrote:

While it is certainly true that the prime minister did not have a legal right to intervene in the editorial process, he could have publicly (as an enactment of free speech) dissociated himself from the publication, from the content of the cartoons, from Rose's explanatory text, from Jyllands-Posten's editorial of the same day, and from the general association of Islam with terrorism. Rasmussen did none of those. Instead, he used his interview [on 30 October 2005] to endorse Jyllands-Posten's position and the act of publishing the cartoons.

The Organisation of Islamic Cooperation (OIC) and Arab League also wrote a joint letter to the Prime Minister expressing alarm about the cartoons and other recent incidents and insults committed by Danish politicians. The Muslim countries continued to work diplomatically to try to have the issue—and the other issues mentioned in their initial letter—addressed by the Danish government. Turkey and Egypt were particularly active. Turkish Prime Minister Recep Tayyip Erdoğan visited Copenhagen in November in an encounter which the Turkish press described as a crisis. Erdogan clashed with Rasmussen over the cartoons as well as Roj TV—a television station affiliated with the Kurdistan Workers' Party—being allowed to broadcast from Denmark. After trying to engage the Danish government diplomatically, Egyptian foreign minister Ahmed Aboul Gheit and the secretaries-general of the OIC and the Arab League sent letters to the OSCE, OECD, and EU foreign policy coordinator complaining about Danish inaction.

=== Judicial investigation of Jyllands-Posten (October 2005 – January 2006) ===
On 27 October 2005, representatives of the Muslim organisations which had complained about the cartoons in early October filed a complaint with the Danish police claiming that Jyllands-Posten had committed an offence under sections 140 and 266b of the Danish Criminal Code, precipitating an investigation by the public prosecutor:

- Section 140 (aka the blasphemy law), prohibits disturbing public order by publicly ridiculing or insulting the dogmas of worship of any lawfully existing religious community in Denmark. Only one case, a 1938 case involving an anti-Semitic group, has ever resulted in a sentence. The most recent case was in 1971 when a programme director of Danmarks Radio was accused in a case involving a song about the Christian god, but was found not guilty.
- Section 266b criminalises insult, threat or degradation of natural persons, by publicly and with malice attacking their race, colour of skin, national or ethnic roots, faith or sexual orientation.

On 6 January 2006, the Regional Public Prosecutor in Viborg discontinued the investigation as he found no basis for concluding that the cartoons constituted a criminal offence because the publication concerned a subject of public interest and Danish case law extends editorial freedom to journalists regarding subjects of public interest. He stated that in assessing what constitutes an offence, the right to freedom of speech must be taken into consideration, and said that freedom of speech must be exercised with the necessary respect for other human rights, including the right to protection against discrimination, insult and degradation. In a new hearing resulting from a complaint about the original decision, the Director of Public Prosecutors in Denmark agreed with the previous ruling.

=== Danish Imams tour the Middle East ===
This picture of a French pig-squealing contestant was unrelated to the Muhammed drawings, but was included in the imams' dossier. Original caption included in the dossier: "Her er det rigtige billede af Muhammed", meaning "Here is the real image of Muhammad."

In December, after communications with the Danish government and the newspaper, the "Committee for Prophet Honouring" decided to gain support and leverage outside of Denmark by meeting directly with religious and political leaders in the Middle East. They created a 43-page dossier, commonly known as the Akkari-Laban dossier (Arabic: ملف عكّاري لبن; after two leading imams), containing the cartoons and supporting materials for their meetings.

The dossier, finalised for the group's trip to Lebanon in mid-December, contained the following:

- An introduction describing the situation of Muslims in Denmark (from the point of view represented by the imams), the country itself, background on the cartoons, and the group's action plan;
- Clippings of the articles and editorials from 30 September 2005 that accompanied the cartoons and a copy of the page with cartoons translated into Arabic;
- An 11-point declaration by Raed Hlayhel against alleged Western double standards about free speech; he wrote that Islam and Muhammed are ridiculed and insulted under the guise of free speech while parallel insults would be unacceptable;
- 11 of the 12 cartoons from the paper itself blown up to A4 size and translated. The cartoon with Muhammad and the sword was not shown here, only in the overview page;
- Copies of letters and the group's press releases;
- Arabic translation of the Jyllands-Posten editorial of 12 October discussing the early controversy and refusing to apologise;
- 10 satirical cartoons from another Danish newspaper, Weekendavisen, published in November 2005 in response to the Jyllands-Posten controversy, which Kasem Ahmad, spokesman for Islamisk Trossamfund, called "even more offensive" than the original 12 cartoons despite being intended as satire. He said that they were part of a broader campaign to denigrate Muslims and were gratuitously provocative;
- Three additional pictures that the dossier's authors alleged were sent to Muslims in Denmark, said to be indicative of the "hate they feel subjected to in Denmark"'
- Some clippings from Egyptian newspapers discussing the group's first visit to Egypt.

The dossier also contained "falsehood about alleged maltreatment of Muslims in Denmark" and the "tendentious lie that Jyllands-Posten was a government-run newspaper".

The imams said that the three additional images were sent anonymously by mail to Muslims who were participating in an online debate on Jyllands-Posten's website, and were apparently included to illustrate the perceived atmosphere of Islamophobia in which they lived. On 1 February, BBC World incorrectly reported that one of the images had been published in Jyllands-Posten. This image was later found to be a wire-service photograph of a contestant at a French pig-squealing contest in the Trie-sur-Baise's annual festival. One of the other two additional images (a photograph) portrayed a Muslim being mounted by a dog while praying, and the other (a cartoon) portrayed Muhammad as a demonic paedophile.

Experts—including Helle Lykke Nielsen—who have examined the dossier said that it was broadly accurate from a technical point of view but contained a few falsehoods and could easily have misled people not familiar with Danish society, an assessment which the imams have since agreed to. Some mistakes were that Islam is not officially recognised as a religion in Denmark (it is); that the cartoons are the result of a contest; and that Anders Fogh Rasmussen in his role as Prime Minister gave a medal to Ayaan Hirsi Ali (he gave one in his capacity as party leader of the Liberal Party).

The imams also claimed to speak on behalf of 28 organisations, many of which later denied any connection to them. Additions such as the "pig" photograph may have polarised the situation (the association of a person and a pig is considered very insulting in Islamic culture), as they were confused for the cartoons published in the newspaper. Muslims who met with the group later said Akkari's delegation had given them the impression that Danish Prime Minister Anders Fogh Rasmussen somehow controlled or owned Jyllands-Posten.

Delegations of imams circulated the dossier on visits to Egypt, Syria and Lebanon in early December 2005, presenting their case to many influential religious and political leaders and asking for support. The group was given high level access on these trips through their contacts in the Egyptian and Lebanese embassies. The dossier was distributed informally on 7–8 December 2005 at a summit of the Organisation of the Islamic Conference (OIC) in Mecca, with many heads of state in attendance. The OIC issued a condemnation of the cartoons: "[We express our] concern at rising hatred against Islam and Muslims and condemned the recent incident of desecration of the image of the Holy Prophet Mohamed." The communique also attacked the practice of "using the freedom of expression as a pretext for defaming religions." Eventually an official communiqué was issued requesting that the United Nations adopt a binding resolution banning contempt of religious beliefs and providing for sanctions to be imposed on contravening countries or institutions. The attention of the OIC is said to have led to media coverage which brought the issue to public attention in many Muslim countries.

=== International protests ===
Protests against the cartoons were held around the world in late January and February 2006. Many of these turned violent, resulting in at least 200 deaths globally, according to the New York Times.

Large demonstrations were held in many majority-Muslim countries, and almost every country with significant Muslim minorities, including:

- Nigeria,
- Canada,
- India,
- United States,
- United Kingdom (see: 2006 Islamist demonstration outside the Embassy of Denmark in London),
- Australia,
- New Zealand,
- Kenya, and
- throughout continental Europe.

In many instances, demonstrations against the cartoons became intertwined with those about other local political grievances. Muslims in the north of Nigeria used protests to attack local Christians as part of an ongoing battle for influence, radical Sunnis used protests against governments in the Middle East, and authoritarian governments used them to bolster their religious and nationalist credentials in internal disputes; these associated political motives explain the intensity of some of the demonstrations.

Several Western embassies were attacked; the Danish and Austrian embassies in Lebanon and the Norwegian and Danish representations in Syria were severely damaged. Christians and Christian churches were also targets of violent retribution in some places. U.S. Secretary of State Condoleezza Rice accused Iran and Syria of organising many of the protests in Iran, Syria, and Lebanon. However, Hezbollah, ally of Syria and Iran in Lebanon, has condemned the attack on the Danish Embassy. Several death threats were made against the cartoonists and the newspaper, resulting in the cartoonists going into hiding. Danish Prime Minister Rasmussen called it Denmark's worst international relations incident since the Second World War.

Peaceful counter-demonstrations in support of the cartoons, Denmark, and freedom of speech were also held. Three national ministers lost their jobs amid the controversy: Roberto Calderoli in Italy for his support of the cartoons, Laila Freivalds in Sweden for her role in shutting down a website displaying the cartoons, and the Libyan Interior Minister after a riot in Benghazi in response to Calderoli's comments, which led to the deaths of at least 10 people.

In India, Haji Yaqub Qureishi, a minister in the Uttar Pradesh state government, announced a cash reward for anyone who beheaded "the Danish cartoonist" who caricatured Mohammad. Subsequently, a case was filed against him in the Lucknow district court and eminent Muslim scholars in India were split between those supporting punishment for the cartoonists and those calling for the minister's sacking. As of 2011, legal action was ongoing.

==== Boycott ====
An example of one of the banners being posted across the web to encourage support for Danish goods

A consumer boycott was organised in Saudi Arabia, Kuwait, and other Middle Eastern countries against Denmark. On 5 March 2006, Ayman al-Zawahiri of Al-Qaeda urged all Muslims to boycott not only Denmark, but also Norway, France, Germany and all others that have "insulted the Prophet Mohammed" by printing cartoons depicting him. Consumer goods companies were the most vulnerable to the boycott; among companies heavily affected were Arla Foods, Novo, and Danisco. Arla, Denmark's biggest exporter to the Middle East, lost 10 million kroner (US$1.6 million, €1.3 million) per day in the initial weeks of the boycott. Scandinavian tourism to Egypt fell by between 20 and 30% in the first two months of 2006.

On 9 September 2006, BBC News reported that the Muslim boycott of Danish goods had reduced Denmark's total exports by 15.5% between February and June. This was attributed to an approximated 50% decline in exports to the Middle East. The BBC said, "The cost to Danish businesses was around 134 million euros ($170m), when compared with the same period last year, the statistics showed." However, The Guardian newspaper in the UK said, "While Danish milk products were dumped in the Middle East, fervent right-wing Americans started buying Bang & Olufsen stereos and Lego. In the first quarter of this year Denmark's exports to the US soared 17%." Overall the boycott did not have a significant effect on the Danish economy.

=== Response to protests and reprintings ===
In response to the initial protests from Muslim groups, Jyllands-Posten published an open letter to the citizens of Saudi Arabia on its website, in Danish and in Arabic, apologising for any offence the drawings may have caused but defending the right of the newspaper to publish them. A second open letter "to the honourable Fellow Citizens of the Muslim World", dated 8 February 2006, had a Danish version, an Arabic version, and an English version:

Serious misunderstandings in respect of some drawings of the Prophet Mohammed have led to much anger ... Please allow me to correct these misunderstandings. On 30 September last year, Morgenavisen Jyllands-Posten published 12 different cartoonists' idea of what the Prophet Mohammed might have looked like ... In our opinion, the 12 drawings were sober. They were not intended to be offensive, nor were they at variance with Danish law, but they have indisputably offended many Muslims for which we apologise.

Six of the cartoons were first reprinted by the Egyptian newspaper El Fagr on 17 October 2005, along with an article strongly denouncing them, but this did not provoke any condemnations or other reactions from religious or government authorities. Between October 2005 and early January 2006, examples of the cartoons were reprinted in major European newspapers from the Netherlands, Germany, Scandinavia, Romania, and Switzerland. After the beginning of major international protests, they were re-published around the globe, but primarily in continental Europe. The cartoons were not reprinted in any major newspapers in Canada, the United Kingdom, or many in the United States where articles covered the story without including them.

Reasons for the decision not to publish the cartoons widely in the United States—despite that country's permissive free speech laws—included increased religious sensitivity, higher integration of Muslims into mainstream society, and a desire to be tactful considering the wars in Iraq and Afghanistan.

Numerous newspapers were closed and editors dismissed, censured, or arrested for their decision or intention to re-publish the cartoons. In some countries, including South Africa, publication of the cartoons was banned by government or court orders.

The OIC denounced calls for the death of the Danish cartoonists. The OIC's Secretary General Ekmeleddin Ihsanoglu said at the height of crisis that the violent protests were "un-Islamic" and appealed for calm. He also denounced calls for a boycott of Danish goods. Twelve high-profile writers, among them Salman Rushdie, signed a letter called "Manifesto: Together Facing the New Totalitarianism" which was published in a number of newspapers. It said that the violence sparked by the publication of cartoons satirising Muhammad "shows the need to fight for secular values and freedom."

=== Later developments ===
Numerous violent plots related to the cartoons have been discovered in the years since the main protests in early 2006. These have primarily targeted editor Flemming Rose, cartoonist Kurt Westergaard, the property or employees of Jyllands-Posten and other newspapers that printed the cartoons, and representatives of the Danish state. Westergaard was the subject of several attacks or planned attacks and lived under special police protection until his death in 2021. On 1 January 2010, police used firearms to stop a would-be assassin in Westergaard's home. In February 2011, the attacker, a 29-year-old Somali man, was sentenced to nine years in prison. (Note: For details of various incidents see: 2006 German train bombing plot, 2008 Danish embassy bombing in Islamabad, Hotel Jørgensen explosion, and 2010 Copenhagen terror plot.) In 2010, three men based in Norway were arrested on suspicion that they were planning a terror attack against Jyllands-Posten or Kurt Westergaard; two of the men were convicted. In the United States, David Headley and Tahawwur Hussain Rana were convicted of planning terrorism against Jyllands-Posten and were sentenced in 2013.

Naser Khader, a Muslim Danish MP, founded an organisation called Democratic Muslims in Denmark in response to the controversy. He was worried that what he believed to be Islamists were seen to speak for all Muslims in Denmark. He said that there is still a sharp division within the Danish Muslim community between Islamists and moderates, and that Denmark had become a target for Islamists. He said that some good came from the crisis because "the cartoon crisis made clear that Muslims are not united and that there is a real difference between the Islamists and people like myself. Danes were shown that talk of 'the Muslims' was too monolithic." He also said that the crisis served as a wake-up call about radical Islam to European countries.

In 2009, when Brandeis University professor Jytte Klausen wanted to publish a book about the controversy titled The Cartoons that Shook the World, Yale University Press refused to publish the cartoons and other representations of Muhammad out of fear for the safety of its staff. In response, another company published Muhammad: The "Banned" Images in what it called "a 'picture book'—or errata to the bowdlerized version of Klausen's book." Five years to the day after the cartoons were first published in Jyllands-Posten, they were republished in Denmark in Rose's book Tyranny of Silence. When the book's international edition was published in the United States in 2014 it did not include the cartoons.

Around 2007 the international counter-jihad movement began to appear as a reaction partly influenced by the Jyllands-Posten cartoon crisis.

To mark the 20th anniversary of the controversy, The Daily Cartoonist declared that the west had failed the test, citing Denmark's 2023 blasphemy law.

=== Regrets ===
In 2013, The Islamic Society in Denmark stated that they regretted their visit to Lebanon and Egypt in 2006 to show the caricatures because the consequences had been much more serious than they expected. In August 2013, Ahmed Akkari expressed his regret for his role in the Imams' tour of the Middle East, stating: "I want to be clear today about the trip: It was totally wrong. At that time, I was so fascinated with this logical force in the Islamic mindset that I could not see the greater picture. I was convinced it was a fight for my faith, Islam." Still a practising Muslim, he said that printing the cartoons was okay and that he personally apologised to the cartoonist Westergaard. Westergaard responded by saying, "I met a man who has converted from being an Islamist to become a humanist who understands the values of our society. To me, he is really sincere, convincing and strong in his views." A spokesman for the Islamic Society of Denmark said, "It is still not OK to publish drawings of Muhammad. We have not changed our position."

==== Charlie Hebdo controversies and attacks ====
The French satirical weekly newspaper Charlie Hebdo was taken to court for publishing the cartoons; it was acquitted of charges that it incited hatred. The incident marked the beginning of a number of violent incidents related to the cartoons of Muhammad at the newspaper over the following decade.

On 2 November 2011, Charlie Hebdo was firebombed right before its 3 November issue was due; the issue was called Charia Hebdo and satirically featured Muhammad as guest-editor. The editor, Stéphane Charbonnier, known as Charb, and two co-workers at Charlie Hebdo subsequently received police protection. Charb was placed on a hit list by Al-Qaeda in the Arabian Peninsula along with Kurt Westergaard, Lars Vilks, Carsten Juste and Flemming Rose after editing an edition of Charlie Hebdo that satirised Muhammad.

On 7 January 2015, two masked gunmen opened fire on Charlie Hebdo's staff and police officers as vengeance for its continued caricatures of Muhammad, killing 12 people, including Charb, and wounding 11 others. Jyllands-Posten did not re-print the Charlie Hebdo cartoons in the wake of the attack, with the new editor-in-chief citing security concerns.

In February 2015, in the wake of the Charlie Hebdo shootings in Paris, a gunman opened fire on attendants and police officers at a meeting discussing freedom of speech with the Swedish cartoonist Lars Vilks among the panelists, and later attacked a synagogue killing two people in Copenhagen in the 2015 Copenhagen shootings.

== Background, opinions and issues ==
=== Danish journalistic tradition ===
Freedom of speech was guaranteed in law by the Danish Constitution of 1849, as it is today by The Constitutional Act of Denmark of 5 June 1953. Danish freedom of expression is quite far-reaching—even by Western European standards—although it is subject to some legal restrictions dealing with libel, hate speech, blasphemy and defamation. The country's comparatively lenient attitude toward freedom of expression has provoked official protests from several foreign governments, for example Germany, Turkey and Russia for allowing controversial organisations to use Denmark as a base for their operations. Reporters Without Borders ranked Denmark at the top of its Worldwide Press Freedom Index for 2005. Danish newspapers are privately owned and independent of government.

At the time, section 140 of the Danish Penal Code criminalized mocking or insulting legal religions and faiths. No-one had at that time been charged under section 140 since 1971 and no-one had been convicted since 1938, even though there have been several convictions since then - notably Danish politicians Mogens Camre and Rasmus Paludan, but also Fadi Abdullatif, spokesman for the Islamic organization of Hizb ut-Tahrir. A complaint was filed against Jyllands-Posten under this section of the law, but the Regional Public Prosecutor declined to file charges, stating "that in assessing what constitutes an offence under both section 140 and section 266 b [discussed below] of the Danish Criminal Code, the right to freedom of expression must be taken into consideration"; he found that no criminal offence had taken place in this case. Section 140 was repealed in 2017.

However, the Director of Public Prosecutions said, "there is, therefore, no free and unrestricted right to express opinions about religious subjects. It is thus not a correct description of existing law when the article in Jyllands-Posten states that it is incompatible with the right to freedom of expression to demand special consideration for religious feelings and that one has to be ready to put up with 'scorn, mockery and ridicule'." Utterances intended for public dissemination deemed hateful based on 'race, colour, national or ethnic origin, belief or sexual orientation' can be penalised under section 266 b of the criminal code. Some people have been convicted under this provision, mostly for speech directed at Muslims.

==== Jyllands-Posten ====
While Jyllands-Posten has published satirical cartoons depicting Christian figures, it rejected unsolicited cartoons in 2003 which depicted Jesus on the grounds that they were offensive, opening it to accusations of a double standard. In February 2006, Jyllands-Posten refused to publish Holocaust cartoons, which included cartoons that mocked or denied the Holocaust, offered by an Iranian newspaper which had held a contest. Six of the less controversial images were later published by Dagbladet Information, after the editors consulted the main rabbi in Copenhagen, and three cartoons were later reprinted in Jyllands-Posten. After the competition had finished, Jyllands-Posten also reprinted the winning and runner-up cartoons.

On 26 February 2006, the cartoonist Kurt Westergaard who drew the "bomb in turban" cartoon—the most controversial of the 12—said: "There are interpretations of [the drawing] that are incorrect. The general impression among Muslims is that it is about Islam as a whole. It is not. It is about certain fundamentalist aspects, that of course are not shared by everyone. But the fuel for the terrorists' acts stem from interpretations of Islam ... if parts of a religion develop in a totalitarian and aggressive direction, then I think you have to protest. We did so under the other 'isms'."

Jyllands-Posten has been described as conservative and it was supportive of the then-ruling party Venstre. It frequently reported on the activities of imams it considered radical, including Raed Hlayhel and Ahmed Akkari. Peter Hervik has argued that anti-Islamic positions and discourse dominated Jyllands-Posten's editorial leadership from at least 2001 until the cartoon crisis.

=== Islamic tradition ===
==== Aniconism ====
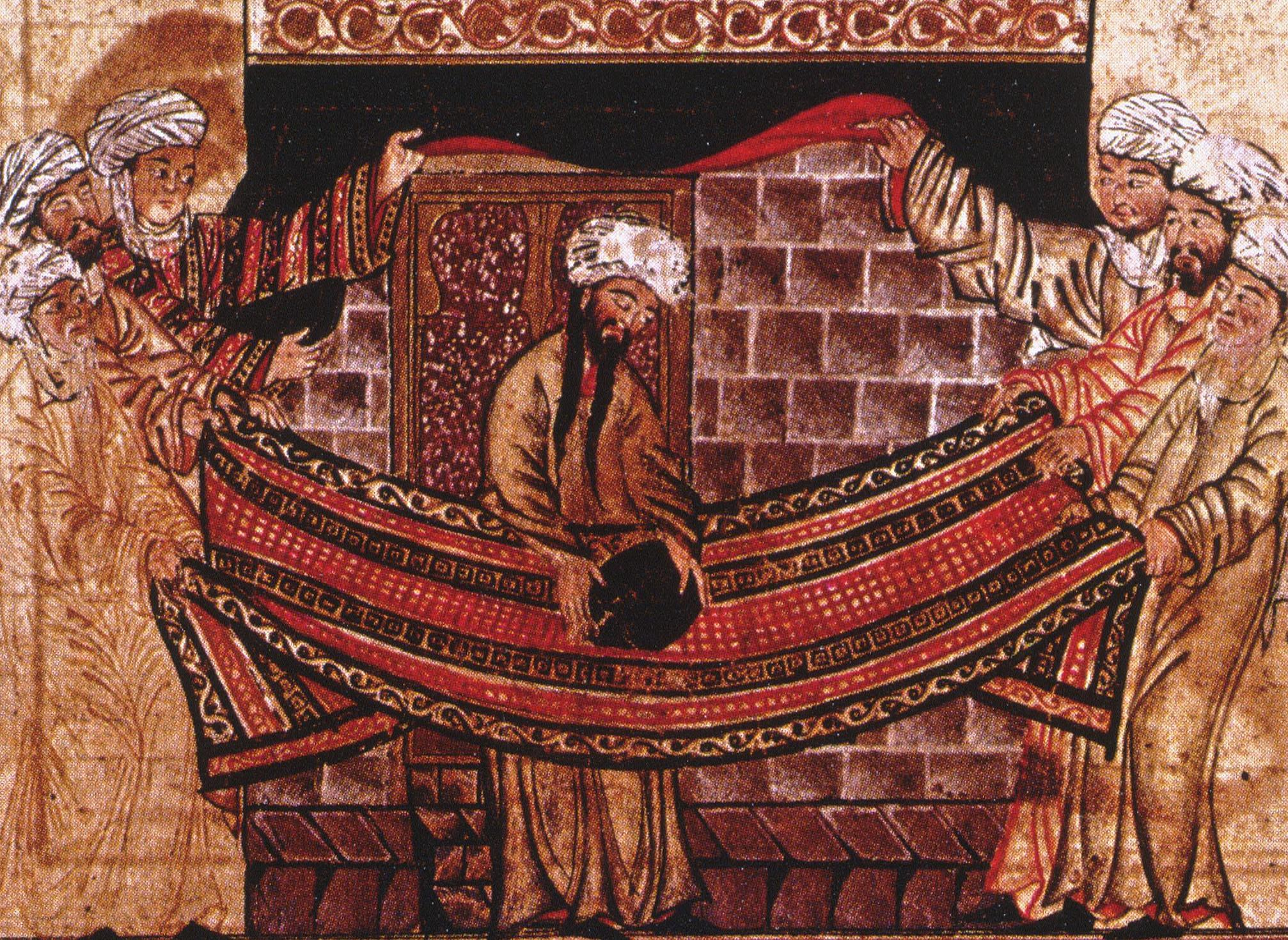
Muhammad rededicating the Kaaba Black Stone, found in the Jami' al-tawarikh by Rashid Al-Din, at the University of Edinburgh library; c. 1315

The Qur'an condemns idolatry, and various hadiths also forbid depictions of living beings. This has led major Islamic scholars and legal schools to prohibit figurative representation; this is known as aniconism. However, since Islam has many centres of religious authority, opinion and tradition about this is not uniform. For mainstream Islamic scholars, all pictorial representations of Prophets are prohibited. In popular practice today there is no general injunction against pictorial representation of people outside of religious contexts. Generally, images of Muhammad have been prohibited throughout history. In practice, images of Muhammad have been made on many occasions, generally in a restricted and socially regulated way; for example, they are often stylised or do not show Muhammad's face. Within Muslim communities, views about pictorial representations have varied: Shi'a Islam has been generally tolerant of pictorial representations of human figures while Sunni Islam generally forbids any pictorial representation of living beings, albeit with some variation in practice outside a religious context. Some contemporary interpretations of Islam, such as those followed by adherents of Wahhabism, are iconoclastic. The movement strongly upholds Tawhid (monotheism), advocate direct return to Scriptures in rejection of Taqlid and view various practices associated with grave veneration as idolatry. Based on these principles, its followers designated themselves as Muwahhidun (Unitarians) and destroyed tombs and shrines of Awliyaa (saints) in regions under their rule. These ideas have influenced contemporary movements such as the Taliban, known for its aniconist views that condemn all forms of pictorial representations and advocate the destruction of idols; most notably the 2001 Destruction of Bamiyan statues.

==== Insulting Muhammad ====
In Muslim societies, insulting Muhammad is considered one of the gravest of all crimes. According to Ana Belen Soage of the University of Granada, "The Islamic sharî'a has traditionally considered blasphemy punishable by death, although modern Muslim thinkers such as Mohammad Hashim Kamali maintain that, given that the Quran does not prescribe a punishment, determining a penalty is left to the judicial authorities of the day." In the Quran itself, "God often instructs Muhammad to be patient to those who insult him and, according to historical records, no action was taken against them during his years in Mecca." Many Muslims said their anti-cartoon stance is against insulting pictures and not so much as against pictures in general. According to the BBC, "It is the satirical intent of the cartoonists and the association of the Prophet with terrorism, that is so offensive to the vast majority of Muslims." This link played into a widespread perception among Muslims across the world that many in the West are hostile towards Islam and Muslims.

=== Political issues ===
The cartoon controversy became one of the highest profile world events in 2006. It attracted a great deal of coverage and commentary, mostly focusing on the situation of Muslims living in the West, the relationship between the Western world and Islamic world, and issues surrounding freedom of speech, secularism, and self-censorship.

==== Situation of Muslim minority in Denmark ====
Approximately 350,000 non-Western immigrants lived in Denmark in 2006, representing about 7% of the country's population. According to figures reported by the BBC, (Note: Other sources show some variation on these figures. For example, the 2010 Report on International Religious Freedom – Denmark gives a figure of about 200,000. See: A report at the UNHCR website) about 270,000 of these were Muslim (ca. 5% of the population). In the 1970s Muslims arrived from Turkey, Pakistan, Morocco and Yugoslavia to work. In the 1980s and 90s most Muslim arrivals were refugees and asylum seekers from Iran, Iraq, Somalia and Bosnia. Muslims are the second-largest religious group in Denmark behind Lutherans.

Peter Hervik said that the cartoon controversy should be seen in the context of an increasingly politicised media environment in Denmark since the 1990s, increasingly negative coverage of Islam and the Muslim minority in Denmark, anti-Muslim rhetoric from the governing political parties, and government policies such as restrictions on immigration and the abolishment of the Board for Ethnic Equality in 2002. Hervik said these themes are often ignored in international coverage of the issue and that they render conclusions that Jyllands-Posten and the Danish government were innocent victims in a dispute over freedom of speech inaccurate. Against this background, Danish Muslims were particularly offended by the cartoons because they reinforced the idea that Danes stigmatize all Muslims as terrorists and do not respect their religious beliefs.

Heiko Henkel of British academic journal Radical Philosophy wrote:

the solicitation and publication of the 'Muhammad cartoons' was part of a long and carefully orchestrated campaign by the conservative Jyllands-Posten (also known in Denmark as Jyllands-Pesten – the plague from Jutland), in which it backed the centre-right Venstre party of Prime Minister Fogh Rasmussen in its successful bid for power in 2001. Central to Venstre's campaign, aside from its neoliberal economic agenda, was the promise to tackle the problem of foreigners who refused to 'integrate' into Danish society.

Kiku Day, writing in The Guardian said, "We were a liberal and tolerant people until the 1990s, when we suddenly awoke to find that for the first time in our history we had a significant minority group living among us. Confronted with the terrifying novelty of being a multicultural country, Denmark took a step not merely to the right but to the far right." Professor Anders Linde-Laursen wrote that while the controversy "should be understood as an expression of a growing Islamophobic tendency in Danish society," this is just the latest manifestation of a long-standing and particularly deep conflict between traditionalists and agents of modernity in Denmark, and should not be seen as a major departure for Danish society.

Danish Muslim politician Naser Khader said, "Muslims are no more discriminated against in Denmark than they are elsewhere in Europe ... Generally, Danes give you a fair shake. They accept Muslims if you declare that you are loyal to this society, to democracy. If you say that you are one of them, they will accept you. If you have reservations, they will worry." His concern has centred on the power of "Islamism" or fundamentalist political Islam in Denmark's Muslim community, which he has tried to fight, especially in the wake of the controversy, by forming an association of democratic, moderate Muslims.

==== Relationship between the West and Muslims ====
The incident occurred at a time of unusually strained relations between parts of the Muslim world and the West. This was a result of several things combined, decades of Muslim immigration to Europe, recent political struggles, violent incidents such as September 11 and a string of Islamist terrorist attacks and Western interventions in Muslim countries. The cartoons were, however, also used as a tool by different political interests in a wide variety of local and international situations, Muslim and otherwise. Some debate surrounded the relationship between Islamic minorities and their broader societies, and the legal and moral limits that the press should observe when commenting on that minority or any religious minority group.

===== Cartoons as a political tool in the West =====
Some commentators see the publications of the cartoons as part of a deliberate effort to show Muslims and Islam in a bad light, thus influencing public opinion in the West in aid of various political projects. Journalist Andrew Mueller wrote, "I am concerned that the ridiculous, disproportionate reaction to some unfunny sketches in an obscure Scandinavian newspaper may confirm that ... Islam and the West are fundamentally irreconcilable". Different groups used the cartoon for different political purposes; Heiko Henkel wrote:

the critique of 'Muslim fundamentalism' has become a cornerstone in the definition of European identities. As well as replacing anti-communism as the rallying point for a broad 'democratic consensus' (and, in this shift, remaking this consensus), the critique of Islamic fundamentalism has also become a conduit for imagining Europe as a moral community beyond the nation. It has emerged as a banner under which the most diverse sectors of society can unite in the name of 'European' values.

Notably, though, political cartoons do not just target Islam. Any subject can be treated, and the political cartoon culture found in many media often give a poignant comment for current events—comparable to a court jester, pointing out uncomfortable or un-tellable truths in a comic fashion

===== Use by Islamists and Middle-Eastern governments =====
Some commentators believed that the controversy was used by Islamists competing for influence both in Europe and the Islamic world. Jytte Klausen wrote that the Muslim reaction to the cartoons was not a spontaneous, emotional reaction arising out of the clash of Western and Islamic civilisations. "Rather it was orchestrated, first by those with vested interests in elections in Denmark and Egypt, and later by Islamic extremists seeking to destabilise governments in Pakistan, Lebanon, Libya, and Nigeria." Other regimes in the Middle East have been accused of taking advantage of the controversy and adding to it to demonstrate their Islamic credentials, distracting from their domestic situations by setting up an external enemy, and according to The Wall Street Journal, "[using] the cartoons ... as a way of showing that the expansion of freedom and democracy in their countries would lead inevitably to the denigration of Islam."

Among others, Iran's supreme leader Ayatollah Ali Khamenei blamed a Zionist conspiracy for the row over the cartoons. Palestinian Christian diplomat Afif Safieh, then the Palestine Liberation Organization's envoy to Washington, alleged the Likud party concocted the distribution of Muhammad caricatures worldwide in a bid to create a clash between the West and the Muslim world.

===== Racism and ignorance =====
One controversy that arose around the cartoons was the question of whether they were racist. The United Nations Commission on Human Rights (UNCHR) Special Rapporteur "on contemporary forms of racism, racial discrimination, xenophobia and related intolerance", Doudou Diène, saw xenophobia and racism in Europe as the root of the controversy, and partly criticised the government of Denmark for inaction after the publication of the cartoons.

However, Aurel Sari, a fellow of SHAPE and the ARRC, has since said that the special rapporteur's interpretation was wrong and that "neither the decision to commission images depicting the Prophet in defiance of Islamic tradition, nor the actual content of the individual cartoons can be regarded as racist within the meaning of the relevant international human rights instruments" although "some of the more controversial pictures may nevertheless be judged 'gratuitously offensive' to the religious beliefs of Muslims in accordance with the applicable case-law of the European Court of Human Rights." This means that the Danish authorities probably could have prohibited the drawings' dissemination if they had chosen to. Randall Hansen said that the cartoons were clearly anti-Islamic, but that this should not be confused with racism because a religion is a system of ideas not an inherent identity. Tariq Modood said that the cartoons were essentially racist because Muslims are in practice treated as a group based on their religion, and that the cartoons were intended to represent all of Islam and all Muslims in a negative way, not just Muhammad. Erik Bleich said that while the cartoons did essentialise Islam in a potentially racist way, they ranged from offensive to pro-Muslim so labelling them as a group was problematic. The Economist said Muslims were not targeted in a discriminatory way, since unflattering cartoons about other religions or their leaders are frequently printed. For Noam Chomsky, the cartoons were inspired by a spirit of "ordinary racism under cover of freedom of expression" and that they must be seen in the context of Jyllands-Posten agenda of incitement against immigrants in Denmark.

El Fagr's 17 October 2005 headline page

Some Muslims saw the cartoons as a sign of lack of education about Islam in Denmark and in the West. Egyptian preacher and television star Amr Khaled urged his followers to take action to remedy supposed Western ignorance, saying, "It is our duty to the prophet of God to make his message known ... Do not say that this is the task of the ulema (religious scholars)—it is the task of all of us." Ana Soage said, "the targeting of a religious symbol like Muhammad, the only prophet that Muslims do not share with Jews and Christians, was perceived as the last in a long list of humiliations and assaults: it is probably not a coincidence that the more violent demonstrations were held in countries like Syria, Iran and Libya, whose relations with the West are tense." Yusuf al-Qaradawi, a prominent Islamic theologian, called for a day of anger from Muslims in response to the cartoons. He supported calls for a UN resolution that "categorically prohibits affronts to prophets—to the prophets of the Lord and His messengers, to His holy books, and to the religious holy places". He also castigated governments around the world for inaction on the issue, saying, "Your silence over such crimes, which offend the Prophet of Islam and insult his great nation, is what begets violence, generates terrorism, and makes the terrorists say: Our governments are doing nothing, and we must avenge our Prophet ourselves. This is what creates terrorism and begets violence."

===== Double standards =====
Ehsan Ahrari of Asia Times accused some European countries of double standards in adopting laws that outlaw Holocaust denial but still defended the concept of freedom of speech in this case. Other scholars also criticized the practice as a double standard. Anti-holocaust or genocide denial laws were in place in Austria, Germany, Belgium, the Czech Republic, France, Israel, Lithuania, Luxembourg, Poland, Portugal, and Romania in 2005. However, Denmark has no such laws and there was—and still is—no EU-wide law against holocaust denial. Randall Hansen said that laws against holocaust denial were not directly comparable with restrictions on social satire, so could not be considered a double standard unless one believed in an absolute right to freedom of speech, and that those who do would doubtless oppose holocaust denial laws. Columnist Charles Krauthammer wrote that there was a double standard in many protesters' demands for religious sensitivity in this case, but not in others. He asked, "Have any of these 'moderates' ever protested the grotesque caricatures of Christians and, most especially, Jews that are broadcast throughout the Middle East on a daily basis?"

===== Relationship between the liberal West and Islam =====
Francis Fukuyama wrote in the online magazine Slate that "while beginning with a commendable European desire to assert basic liberal values," the controversy was an alarming sign of the degree of cultural conflict between Muslim immigrant communities in Europe and their broader populations, and advocated a measured and prudent response to the situation. Helle Rytkonen wrote in Danish Foreign Policy Yearbook 2007 that most of the debate around the cartoon controversy was over-simplified as a simple matter of free speech against religion. She said that the actual dispute was more nuanced, focusing on the tone of the debate and broader context of Western-Islamic relations.

Christopher Hitchens wrote in Slate that official reaction in the West—particularly the United States—was too lenient toward the protesters and Muslim community in Denmark, and insufficiently supportive of Denmark and the right to free speech:

Nobody in authority can be found to state the obvious and the necessary—that we stand with the Danes against this defamation and blackmail and sabotage. Instead, all compassion and concern is apparently to be expended upon those who lit the powder trail, and who yell and scream for joy as the embassies of democracies are put to the torch in the capital cities of miserable, fly-blown dictatorships. Let's be sure we haven't hurt the vandals' feelings.

William Kristol also wrote that the response of Western leaders, with the exception of the Danish Prime Minister, was too weak and that the issue was used as an excuse by "those who are threatened by our effort to help liberalize and civilize the Middle East" to fight back against the "assault" on radical Islamists and Middle Eastern dictatorships.

Flemming Rose said he did not expect a violent reaction, and talked about what the incident implies about the relationship between the West and the Muslim world:

I spoke to [historian of Islam] Bernard Lewis about this, and he said that the big difference between our case and the Rushdie affair is that Rushdie is perceived as an apostate by the Muslims while, in our case, Muslims were insisting on applying Islamic law to what non-Muslims are doing in non-Muslim countries. In that sense, he said it is a kind of unique case that might indicate that Europe is perceived as some kind of intermediate state between the Muslim world and the non-Muslim world.

==== Freedom of speech, political correctness and self-censorship ====
One of the principal lines of controversy surrounding the cartoons concerned the limits of free speech, how much it should be legally or ethically constrained and whether the cartoons were an appropriate expression for a newspaper to print. The cartoons were first printed in response to the perception of some journalists at the newspaper that self-censorship was becoming a problem; the ensuing reaction did nothing to dispel that idea. Rose said:

When I wrote the accompanying text to the publication of the cartoons, I said that this act was about self-censorship, not free speech. Free speech is on the books; we have the law, and nobody as yet has thought of rewriting it. This changed when the death threats were issued; it became an issue of the Sharia trumping the fundamental right of free speech.

Rose also highlighted what he believed to be a difference between political correctness and self-censorship—which he considered more dangerous. He said:

There is a very important distinction to be made here between what you perceive as good behavior and a fear keeping you from doing things that you want to do ... A good example of this was the illustrator who refused to illustrate a children's book about the life of Mohammed. He is on the record in two interviews saying that he insisted on anonymity because he was afraid.

Christopher Hitchens wrote that it is important to affirm "the right to criticize not merely Islam but religion in general." He criticised media outlets which did not print the cartoons while covering the story. Ralf Dahrendorf wrote that the violent reaction to the cartoons constituted a sort of counter-enlightenment which must be defended against. Sonia Mikich wrote in Die Tageszeitung, "I hereby refuse to feel badly for the chronically insulted. I refuse to argue politely why freedom of expression, reason and humour should be respected". She said that those things are part of a healthy society and that deeply held feelings or beliefs should not be exempt from commentary, and that those offended had the option of ignoring them.

Ashwani K. Peetush of Wilfrid Laurier University wrote that in a liberal democracy freedom of speech is not absolute, and that reasonable limits are put on it such as libel, defamation and hate speech laws in almost every society to protect individuals from "devastating and direct harm." He said that it is reasonable to consider two of the cartoons as hate speech, which directly undermine a group of people (Muslims) by forming part of an established discourse linking all Muslims with terrorism and barbarity:

[The cartoons] create a social environment of conflict and intimidation for a community that already feels that its way of life is threatened. I do not see how such tactics incorporate people into the wider public and democratic sphere, as Rose argues. They have the opposite effect: the marginalised feel further marginalised and powerless.

In France, the satirical magazine Charlie Hebdo was taken to court for publishing the cartoons; it was acquitted of charges that it incited hatred. In Canada a human rights commission investigated The Western Standard, a magazine which published the cartoons, but found insufficient grounds to proceed with a human rights tribunal (which does not imply criminal charges, but is a quasi-judicial, mandatory process) against the publication. These government investigations of journalists catalysed debate about the role of government in censoring or prosecuting expressions they deemed potentially hateful.

Critics said the cartoon controversy was a sign that attempts at judicial codification of such concepts as respect, tolerance and offence have backfired on the West. Michael Neumann wrote:

Western piety has left the West without a leg to stand on in this dispute. It is no good trumpeting rights of free expression, because these rights are now supposed to have nebulous but severe limitations.

Tim Cavanaugh wrote that the incident revealed the danger of hate speech laws:

The issue will almost certainly lead to a revisiting of the lamentable laws against 'hate speech' in Europe, and with any luck to a debate on whether these laws are more likely to destroy public harmony than encourage it.

== Comparable incidents ==
The following incidents are often compared to the cartoon controversy:

- The Satanic Verses controversy (novel, 1988, global)
- The Calcutta Quran Petition (a controversy about a petition to ban the Quran, 1985, India)
- The Message (film, 1976, United States, Libya, UK and Lebanon)
- Capitalist Piglet (cartoon, published in response to the Jyllands-Posten incident, generating national attention, 2006, Canada)
- Gregorius Nekschot (cartoons, 2008, Netherlands)
- Innocence of Muslims (film, 2012, United States)
- Charlie Hebdo (cartoon controversies, 2011 and 2012; terror attack, 2015)
- Fitna, 2008 Dutch film about Islam, which led to worldwide Muslim protests and a hate speech trial
- Behzti, (2004 play, United Kingdom)
- Submission (film, 2004, the Netherlands)
- 2005 Cronulla riots
- Lars Vilks Muhammad drawings controversy
- 2007 Bangladesh cartoon controversy
- 2015 Copenhagen shootings
- Murder of Samuel Paty
- South Park Muhammad controversy
- Everybody Draw Muhammad Day

== See also ==
- Blasphemy Day – Celebrated on 30 September to coincide with the anniversary of the publication of the cartoons
- Charlie Hebdo shooting – 2015 terrorist attack in Paris, France
- Clareification – Student newspaper with a related controversy
- Dove World Outreach Center Quran-burning controversy – 2010 burning of Qurans by Christian preacher Terry Jones in Gainesville, Florida, USA
- The First Temptation of Christ – 2019 film by Rodrigo Van Der Put
- The Messenger of God – A 2015 film the creation of which was inspired by the cartoons
