= Marchen Neel Gjertsen =

Danish journalist (born 1985)

- Born: September 16, 1985 (age 41); Glostrup, Denmark

Marchen Neel Gjertsen (born 16 September 1985 in Glostrup) is a Danish journalist, who has served as editor-in-chief of Jyllands-Posten since 2021. In 2005, she ran unsuccessfully in the municipal elections for the Odense Municipality as a candidate for the Red–Green Alliance. She received 47 personal votes. She was in 2008 elected the first leader of Syddanske Studerende, being succeeded by Freja Brandhøj in 2009.

In a January 2024 interview with Euroman, she said that she had written parts of a university exam paper for a friend. When several university employees pointed out that the act was an example of exam cheating, Gjertsen subsequently apologized and called her behavior an expression of poor judgment.

In 2019 she received the talent award by the National Press Club of Denmark.
