= 2006 German train bombing attempts =

Terrorist incident in Germany

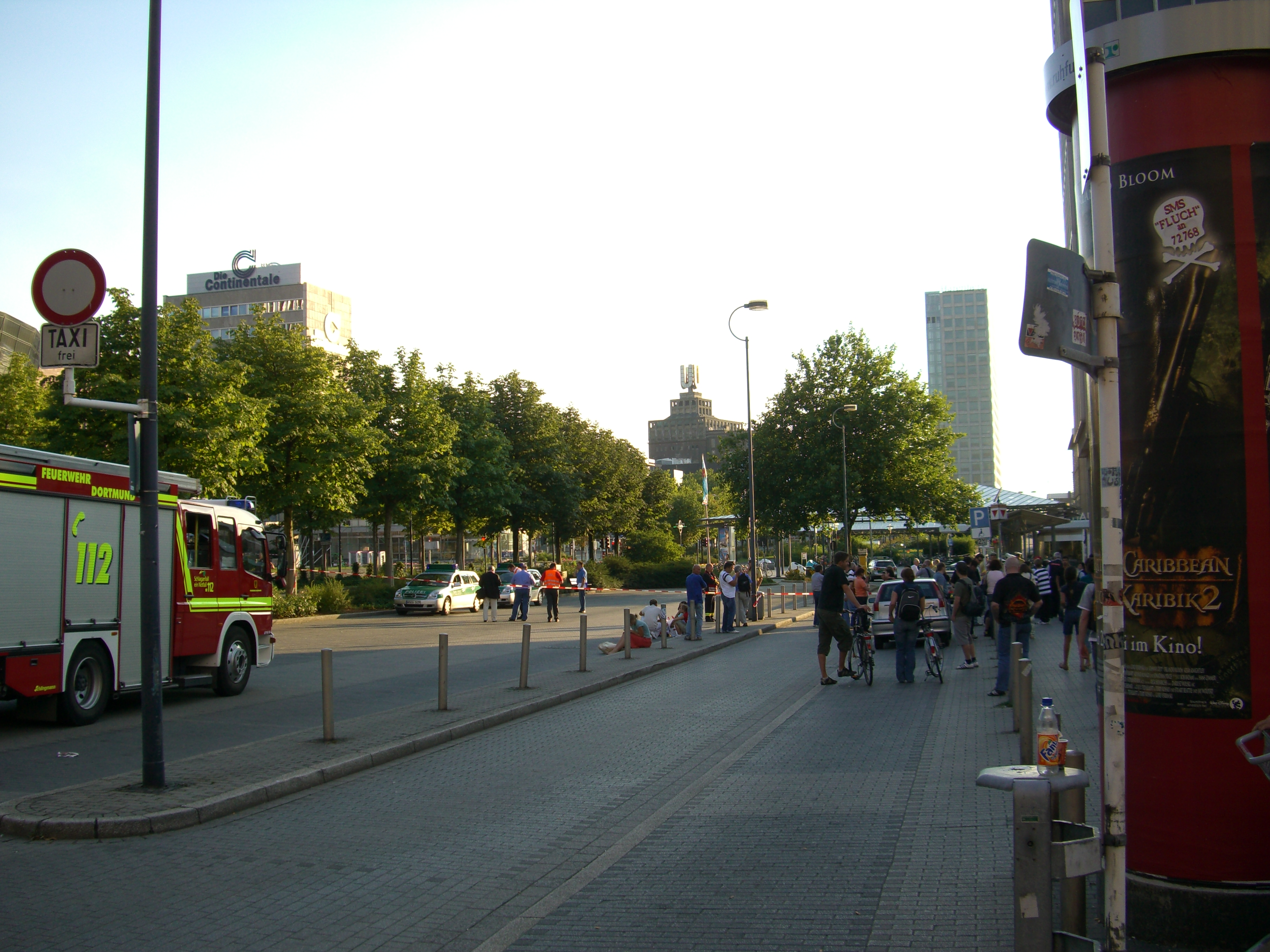
- Police cordon of the Dortmund Hauptbahnhof
- Location: Cologne, North Rhine-Westphalia, on trains en route to (1) Hamm or Dortmund, North Rhine-Westphalia, and (2) Koblenz, Rhineland-Palatinate
- Date: 31 July 2006
- Target: Commuter trains
- Attack type: Bombings (attempted)
- Weapon: Improvised explosive devices
- Victims: None; bombs failed to ignite
- Perpetrators: Youssef Mohamad el-Hajdib and Jihad Hamad
- Motive: Islamic terrorism

On 31 July 2006, two men placed two suitcases filled with bombs on regional commuter trains in Germany. Departing from the central station in Cologne, the bombs were timed to go off near Hamm or Dortmund and near Koblenz, and according to German investigators "would have resulted in the deaths of hundreds of people ... on a much larger scale than the terrorist attacks on London subways and buses in July 2005." However, due to faulty construction, the bombs only failed to ignite, even as the detonators worked. According to the German prosecutor, at the time Germany had "never been closer to an Islamist attack than in this case."

German investigators suspected a terrorist organisation was behind the plot. Investigations found two Lebanese men to have been behind the attempted bombings. Jihad Hamad, who had fled to Lebanon after the attempted attacks was sentenced to twelve years in prison in Beirut in 2007. Youssef Mohamad el-Hajdib, arrested in Kiel on 19 August, was in 2008 sentenced to life in prison in Germany for the attempted bombings. There remained suspicions of involvement by the brother of one of the convicted men, Saddam el-Hajdib, a high-ranking member of Fatah al-Islam who was killed in fighting with the Lebanese Army before he could be tried in court.

Europol classified the attack as Islamic terrorism in a 2007 report.

== Suspects ==
=== Youssef Mohamad El Hajdib ===
El Hajdib, aged 21, was arrested at Kiel's central train station on 19 August 2006. There were reports two weeks later in connection with the Vollsmose terrorist trial that he was trying to travel to Denmark and that he had Odense imam Abu Bashar's telephone in his pocket. Bashar denied knowing El Hajdib. On 9 December 2008 El Hajdib was sentenced to life in prison by a German court for attempted murder and the attempt to cause an explosion. After serving his sentence, he will be deported to Egypt. In 2020 El Hajdib was extradited to Lebanon. https://www.tagesschau.de/inland/kofferbomber-koeln-abschiebung-101.html

=== Jihad Hamad ===
Hamad, aged 20, fled to Lebanon after the failed attack and tried to hide with his family. He turned himself to Lebanese authorities in Beirut a few days after El Hajdib was arrested. His family lives in Al-Kobbe, Tripoli. In his youth Jihad went to a Christian school. Jihad came to Essen to live with his uncle, study and work. Jihad confessed to depositing the luggage on the trains but claimed he was unaware it was a bomb. He also said El Hajdib and he had researched on the internet how to prepare attacks which would cause increased suffering. Hamad told Lebanese interrogators that El Hajdib saw the Jyllands-Posten Muhammad cartoons controversy as an attack by the Western world on Islam. Further motivation was the killing of Al-Qaeda in Iraq leader Abu Musab al-Zarqawi on 7 June 2006 by US forces. Hamad and El Hajdib lived together in Cologne. Hamad was sentenced in December 2007 to twelve years in prison with hard labour in Beirut.

=== Other suspects ===
- Saddam el-Hajdib - brother of Youssef Mohamad El Hajdib, and a high-ranking member of the Fatah al-Islam group, was suspected of helping plan a serious attack. He was killed in fighting between Fatah al-Islam and the Lebanese Armed Forces in May 2007.
- Ayman Hawa, 20 - from Akkar, arrested on 28 August 2006 by Lebanese authorities.
- Khaled Khair-Eddin el-Hajdib - arrested in Lebanon by authorities.
- Khalil al-Boubou - arrested in Lebanon by authorities.

== Bombs and evidence ==
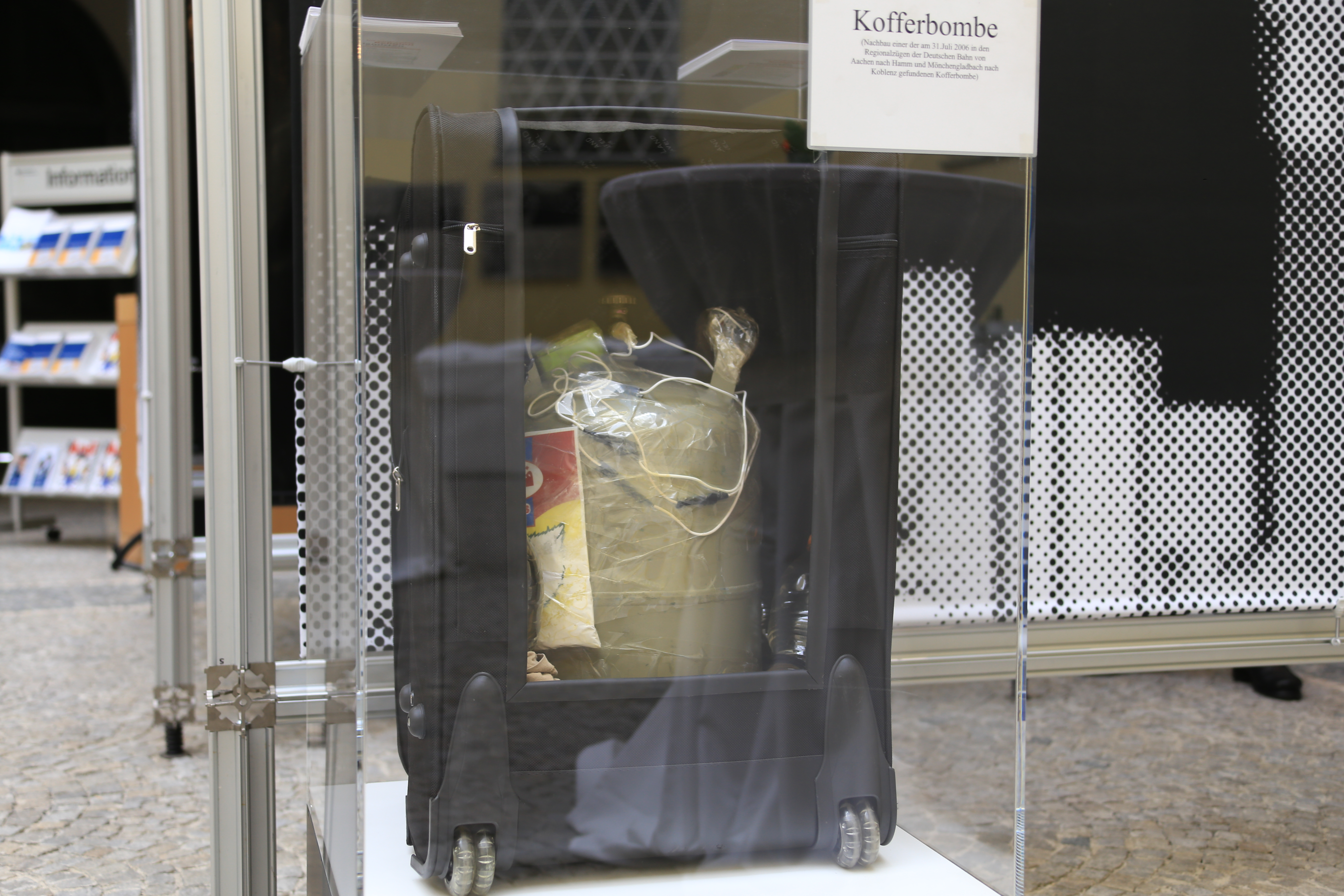
One of the suitcase bombs on display by the Bundesamt für Verfassungsschutz in 2014

The plans for the bombs were taken from the internet. The suspects diverged at a few points and it was there that technical mistakes were made. The devices cost about 200-300 Euro to build. The bombs were made from propane barbecue canisters to be triggered with gasoline and makeshift detonators. The detonators went off, but failed to ignite the gas. According to German security services the attacks were originally planned for the 2006 FIFA World Cup, several weeks earlier, but the suspects abandoned the plan when they considered the implications of such an attack.

A search of the suspects' apartment found DNA matching that on the suitcases and receipts for the gas canister and gas. Surveillance cameras caught both suspects carrying wheeled baggage onto the train at Cologne.
