= Akkari-Laban dossier =

Document concerning the Jyllands-Posten Muhammad cartoons controversy

Cover page: "Dossier about championing [the cause of] the prophet Muhammad"

The Akkari-Laban dossier (Arabic: ملف عكّاري لبن) is a 43-page document which was created by a group of Danish Muslim clerics from multiple organizations set out to present their case and ask for support from Islamic leadership in Egypt, Lebanon and elsewhere, in the Jyllands-Posten Muhammad cartoons controversy.

Among the leadership of the Danish-based "European Committee for Prophet Honouring", formed as an umbrella group of Muslim organizations were Imam Ahmad Abu Laban of the Islamisk Trossamfund and Akhmad Akkari, the spokesman of the group. Danish Sheik Raeed Huleyhel was named head of the group and signed the petition letters.

== History ==
The first delegation of five, headed by Mohamad Al-Khaled of The Community of Islam, landed in Egypt on 3 December 2005 and returned 11 December 2005. Among the people the group met on their visit to Egypt were: The General Secretary of the Arab League Amr Moussa, the Egyptian Grand Mufti Ali Gomaa, the Sheik of Cairo's Al-Azhar university Muhammad Sayyid Tantawy and Muhammed Shaaban, an advisor to the Egyptian Foreign Minister. This meeting was arranged by Egypt's ambassador to Denmark, Mona Omar Attia, later criticized by the Danish foreign ministry for adding to the unrest by alleging that Islam was not an officially recognized religion in Denmark, and transferred from her post at Copenhagen.

The second delegation, comprising four Danish Muslims headed by Sheik Raeed Huleyhel, travelled to Lebanon on 17 December 2005 and returned to on Denmark 31 December 2005. In Lebanon they met the Grand Mufti Muhammad Rashid Kabbani, top Shiite Sheikh Muhammad Hussein Fadlallah, Maronite Church leader Nasrallah Sfeir. During that time, Imam Ahmed Akkari also visited Syria to present their case to Grand Mufti Ahmed Badr-Eddine Hassoun. Furthermore, a smaller delegation traveled to Turkey while individuals visited Sudan, Morocco, Algeria, and Qatar, where Abu Laban briefed Sheikh Yusuf al-Qaradawi of the Muslim Brotherhood.

At a 6 December 2005 summit of the OIC, with many heads of state in attention, the dossier was handed around by the Egyptian foreign minister Ahmed Abul-Gheit on the sidelines first, but eventually an official communique was issued.

The dossier consists of several letters from Muslim organizations explaining their case, multiple clippings from Jyllands-Posten, multiple clippings from Weekendavisen, and some additional images that, according to the dossier's authors, had been sent to Muslims in Denmark.

The dossier appears to have been assembled and added to until some point after 8 December 2005, with the first lobbying visits to Egypt having taken place before finalization. Several pages contain hand written notes, mostly translations from captions of cartoons. It is unknown if these were already present in the dossier or are later additions.

== Content ==
The dossier contained such statements as the following:

- We urge you [recipient of the letter or dossier] to — on the behalf of thousands of believing Muslims — to give us the opportunity of having a constructive contact with the press and particularly with the relevant decision makers, not briefly, but with a scientific methodology and a planned and long-term programme seeking to make views converge and remove misunderstandings between the two parties involved. Since we do not wish for Muslims to be accused of being backward and narrow, likewise we do not wish for Danes to be accused of ideological arrogance either. When this relationship is back on track, the result will bring satisfaction, an underpinning of security and the stable relations, and a flourishing Denmark for all that live here.
- The faithful in their religion (Muslims) suffer under a number of circumstances, first and foremost the lack of official recognition of the Islamic faith. This has led to a lot of problems, especially the lack of right to build mosques [...]
- Even though they [the Danes] belong to the Christian faith, secularization has overcome them, and if you say that they are all infidels, then you are not wrong.
- We [Muslims] do not need lessons in democracy, but it is actually us, who through our deeds and speeches educate the whole world in democracy.
- This [Europe's] dictatorial way of using democracy is completely unacceptable.

== Experts' view ==
Experts, including Helle Lykke Nielsen, who have examined the dossier said that it was broadly accurate but contained a few falsehoods and could easily have misled people not familiar with Danish society, an assessment which the imams have since agreed to. Some mistakes were that Islam is not officially recognised as a religion in Denmark, that the cartoons are the result of a contest, and that Anders Fogh Rasmussen in his role as Prime Minister gave a medal to Ayaan Hirsi Ali (he gave one in his capacity as party leader of the Liberal Party). The imams also claimed to speak on behalf of 28 organisations, many of which later denied any connection to them. Additions such as the "pig" photograph may have polarised the situation (the association of a person and a pig is considered very insulting in Islamic culture), as they were confused for the cartoons published in the newspaper.

Later, it was discovered that the pig photograph was from Associated Press, from coverage of La Pourcailhade, a French farming festival. The person in the photograph would have been a farmer poking fun at himself. As for the other extra picture and the drawing, the authors of the file have never been willing to say where they came from.

Muslims who met with the group later said Akkari's delegation had given them the impression that Danish Prime Minister Anders Fogh Rasmussen somehow controlled or owned Jyllands-Posten.

== Sources ==
- The complete dossier (PDF, colour, 11.8 MB file)
- Another source for the complete dossier: monkeydyne.com
- Danish translations of the introductory letter, and a letter to Islamic ambassadors, and a letter to government ministers. Ekstra Bladet
- Complete translation of the dossier into Danish Politiken
