= Trie-sur-Baïse =

- Commune
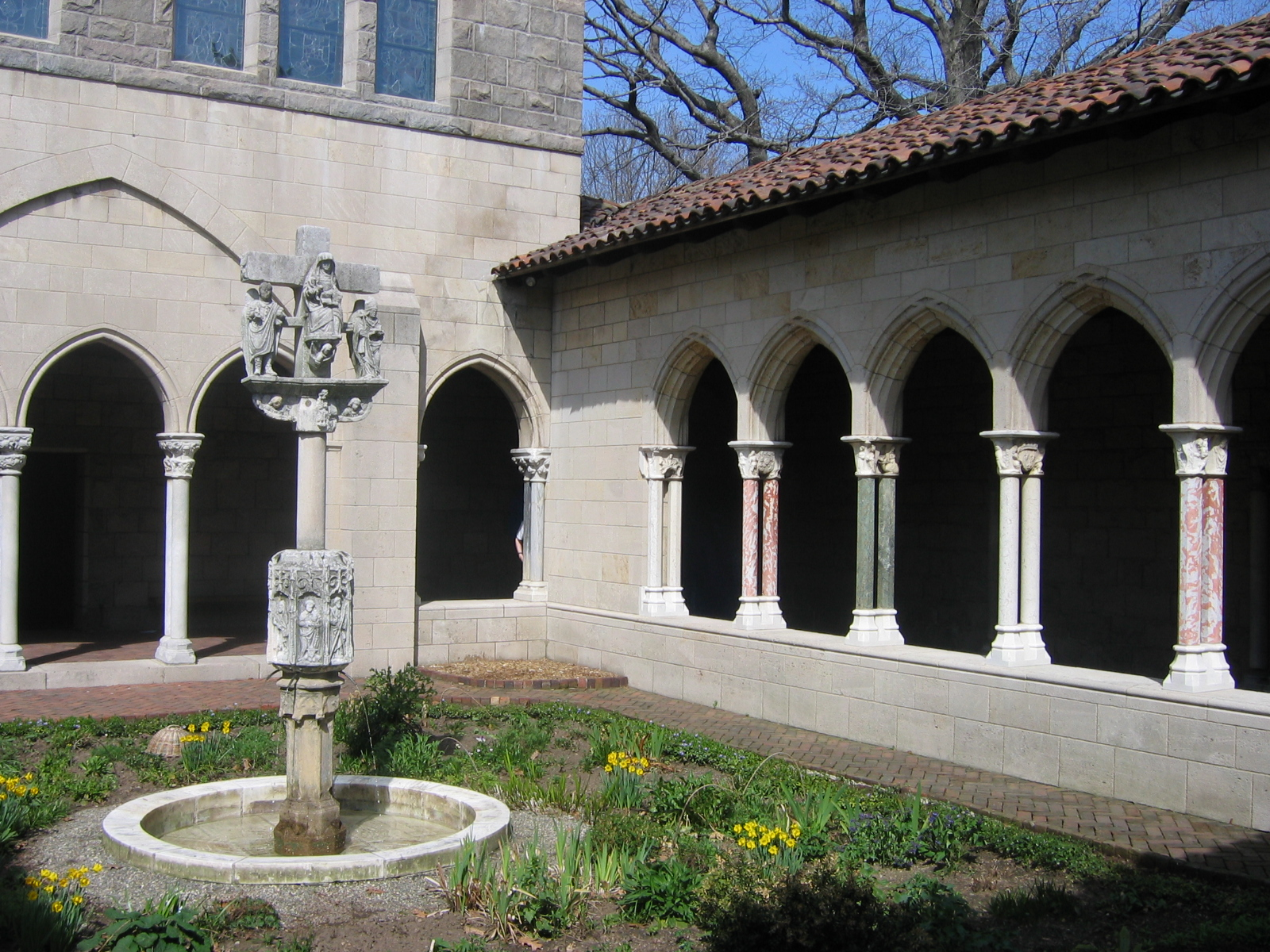
- Trie cloister, relocated to The Cloisters museum in New York.

- Coat of arms
- Location of Trie-sur-Baïse
- Location within France Location within Occitanie
- Coordinates: 43°19′20″N 0°22′16″E
- Country: France
- Region: Occitania
- Department: Hautes-Pyrénées
- Arrondissement: Tarbes
- Canton: Les Coteaux
- Intercommunality: Pays de Trie et Magnoac

Government
  - Mayor (2020–2026): Jean-Pierre Grasset
- Area^{1}: 11.2 km^{2} (4.3 sq mi)
- Elevation: 242 m (794 ft)
- Highest elevation: 360 m (1,180 ft)
- Lowest elevation: 224 m (735 ft)
- Population (2023): 1,006
  - Density: 89.8/km^{2} (233/sq mi)
- Time zone: UTC+01:00 (CET)
  - Summer (DST): UTC+02:00 (CEST)
- INSEE/Postal code: 65452 /65220
- ^{1} French Land Register data, which excludes lakes, ponds, glaciers > 1 km^{2} (0.386 sq mi or 247 acres) and river estuaries.

Trie-sur-Baïse (French pronunciation: [tʁi syʁ ba.iz]; Occitan: Tria de Baïsa) is a commune in the Hautes-Pyrénées department in south-western France. It is the administrative center in a canton comprising 22 villages. It is famous for its annual pig festival known as La Pourcailhade.

== Origin of name ==
Trie-sur-Baïse is named after Jean de Trie, Lord of Toulouse.

== Geography ==
Trie-sur-Baïse is a commune of the Pays des Coteaux, an administrative area that includes Tournay, Castelnau-Magnoac, Pouyastruc and Galan. The town lies next to the Baïse river, which runs through the Gers et de Lot-et-Garonne and Hautes-Pyrénées departments.

Trie-sur-Baïse is a crossing point of five roads going to Castelnau-Magnoac (towards Toulouse), Lannemezan, Miélan, Mirande and Tarbes.

== History ==
Trie-sur-Baïse is located in the Hautes-Pyrénées department in south-western France. The royal fortified town of Trie-sur-Baïse, the new Bastide, was founded in 1323 under a contract of a paréage signed by Jean de Trie, Seneschal of Toulouse and representative of the King, the seigneur of Bernard Duffort Manas, the seigneur of Puydarrieux Gerald of Esparros and a representative of the abbey Escaladieu, Father Roger Mauleon. In 1355, the city was sieged and destroyed by the Prince of Wales, better known as Black Prince, as part of his devastating expeditions to the Southwest of France during the Hundred Year War. The reconstruction of the city started in 1365.

== Structure ==
The structure of the town follows the classic structure of the Bastide with the central square surrounded by stone houses and shops under the arcades. In some Bastides, the old market structures, the halles- have been replaced by more recent buildings. This is the case for Trie-sur-Baïse, where the central market building was reconstructed using iron.

== Timeline ==
- 1323 - Foundation of the bastide (a walled town)
- 1325 - Inauguration of a weekly market.
- 1355 - Siege and destruction of the town by the Black Prince.
- 1360-1362 - Town invaded and pillaged by the English four times.
- 1363 - Reconstruction by the inhabitants.
- 1849 - Modernisation of the town which takes on its current form.

== Main sights ==
=== The Parish Church ===
==== The legend ====
In August 1355, the early inhabitants of Trie assembled to decide where the church should be built. Snow began to fall and covered the ground except for one spot in the shape of a cross. This is where they built the first chapel dedicated to our "Lady of the snow", who is, to this day, the protector of the town. The anniversary on the first Sunday of August is still a date for important local worship and rejoicing.

=== The Carmes monastery ===
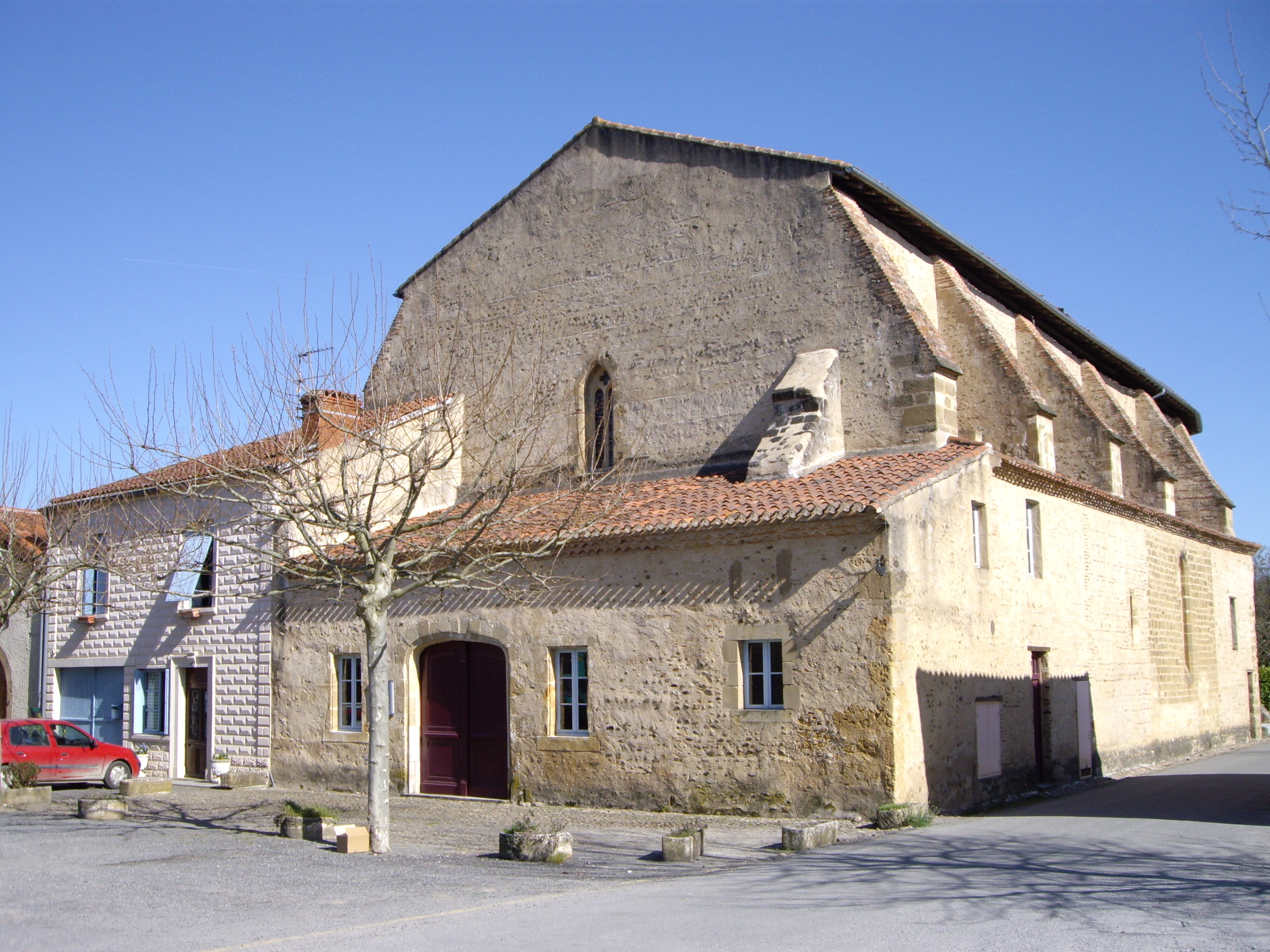
The Carmes monastery

The Carmes monastery was founded in 1365. In 1659, arson destroyed the main buildings and only the church could be partly saved from complete destruction. The monastery was only rebuilt 60 to 70 years later.

The church was fully restored in 1992 and has today become a center of cultural activities. A typical example of meridional gothic architecture, the church is the centerpoint of local historical interest and its cloister has been reconstructed stone by stone at The Cloisters museum in New York City.

== Economy ==
In Trie-sur-Baïse, there are shops to satisfy everyday requirements. In addition, every Tuesday, there is a traditional market in the centre of town.

From December to February, the special "marché au gras" (goose and duck produce) takes place on Sundays.

Also at the end of August is the "foire aux broutards", where over 3500 calves are sold.

The local economy is primarily based on agriculture, with corn, wheat, beets, canola and soy, among others, grown. The region is well-known for its high-quality veal that is raised "under the mother" and for duck. Haricots Tarbais (Indication Géographique Protégée), a delicious white bean prized for its rich flavour and fine skin, is grown locally, usually in conjunction with corn crops as the corn stalks are used to support the climbing beans.

== Sports ==
Rugby is a popular sport, with the local FCT teams playing regular matches. The handball, badminton, cycling, football (soccer), judo, skeet shooting and tennis clubs are also active. Cycling is a popular sport in the region, with Trie being ideally located for rides on relatively flat roads or longer rides in the mountains. There are also trails for mountain biking.

On 26 July 2018, stage 18 of the Tour de France departed from Trie-sur-Baïse, with the route taking the professional cyclists to the finish in Pau.

== Festivals ==
=== La Grande Pourcailhade ===
The festival, called "La Grande Pourcailhade", was based around the theme of the pig and was traditionally held at the beginning of August. However, due to a lack of volunteers, notably for the pig-squealing contest, it was decided by the festival's organisers, the town's Office de Tourisme, that the festival would be cancelled for 2012 and thereafter until a more convenient date could be agreed upon (Office de Tourisme). August is a poor month due to it being the region's hottest month of the year and the time of year most French people, and therefore potential volunteers, take their annual holidays.

During the day, pigs and pork were the subject of various events, for example:

- the (human) pig-squealing contest
- the sausage-eating contest
- the best pig disguise contest
- piglet racing

In the evening, dinner was served and, to end the day with a flourish, musical entertainment was provided by a celebrity. After a run of 36 years, the last festival was held in 2011.

=== Night markets ===
Each year, on July 13 and August 13, night markets with fireworks, music and dancing are held from 7 pm onwards on the town square.

=== Antique fair ===
At the end of July, an antique fair is organised where one can buy, sell or simply admire curios, pieces of furniture and artefacts.

=== Local fair ===
Around the first Sunday of August, the local fair takes place over five days with various activities for children and adults.

== See also ==
- Communes of the Hautes-Pyrénées department
