= Hotel Jørgensen explosion =

2010 explosion in Copenhagen, Denmark

Coordinates: 55°41′1.47″N 12°34′5.55″E

Hotel Jørgensen bombing
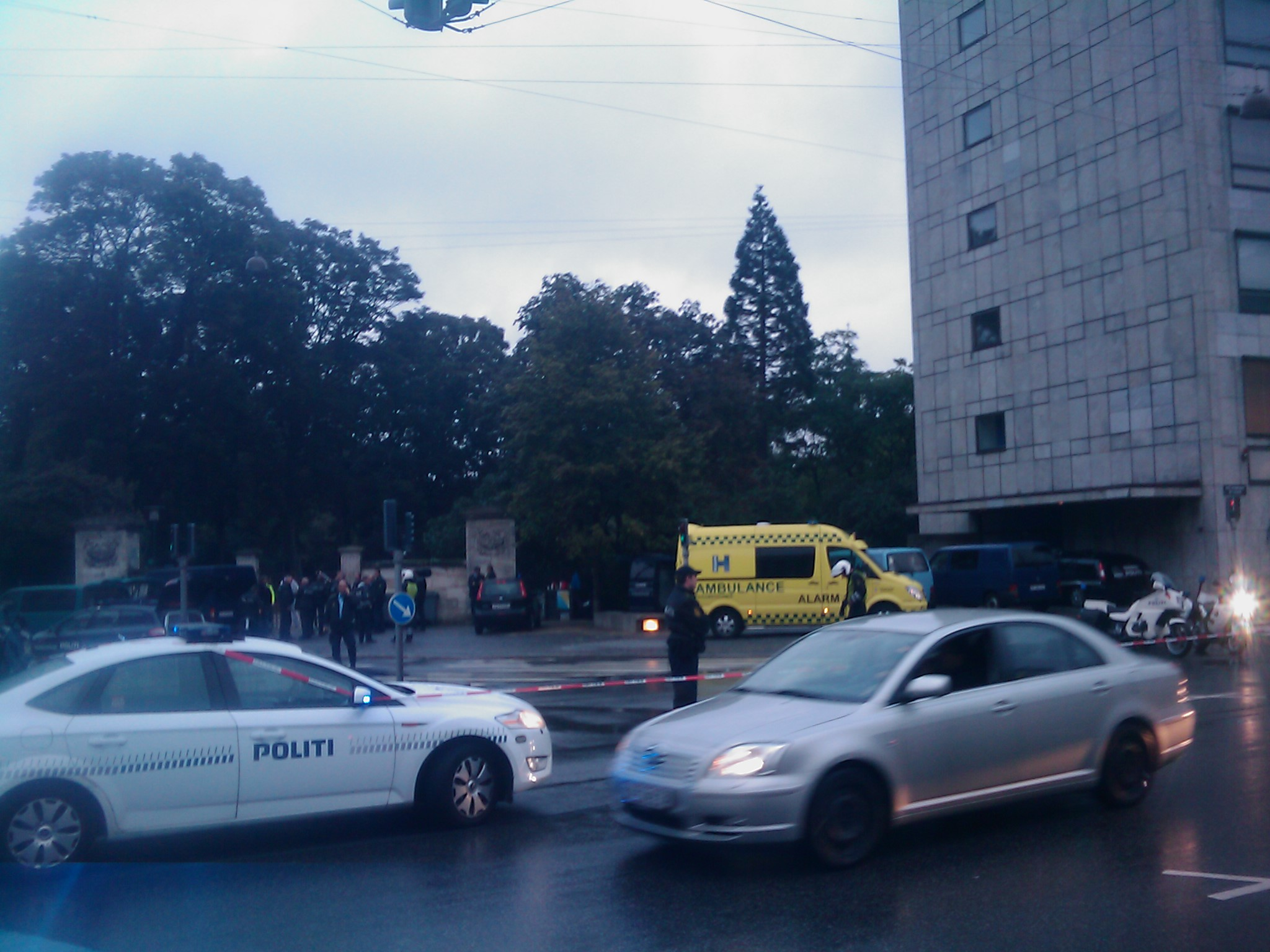
- Because of investigation, Ørstedsparken was closed by the police
- Location: Copenhagen, Denmark
- Date: Friday 10 September 2010; 1:23 p.m. (UTC+1)
- Attack type: Bombing, terrorism, accident
- Deaths: 0
- Injuries: 1 (the bomber)
- Perpetrator: Lors Doukaiev (Chechnyan-Belgian)

The explosion at Hotel Jørgensen was a minor explosion inside of the discount hostel of the same name in central Copenhagen, Denmark. The explosion happened at 1:23 pm on 10 September 2010. No fatalities were recorded. The only injured person was the one-legged Chechnyan-Belgian bomber Lors Doukaiev, who was caught in a nearby park, Ørstedsparken, following the explosion, but only identified several days later.

Doukaiev has been confirmed by the German security agency Verfassungsschutz to have maintained close contacts with Islamic extremists in the German city of Bremen.

== Investigation ==
Considering that the bomber bought a bus ticket to Belgium with departure from Denmark on 10 September, and he was seen at a post office buying a small box used for mailing CDs, as well as a roll of tape, it is believed that it was not meant to be a suicide attack against the hostel, but rather an accident while making a letter bomb, which happened as a consequence of Doukaiev's use of a highly volatile explosive substance.

Lors Doukaiev was also seen in a video game shop, buying a game whose case he could have intended to use as a container for the bomb.

The Danish police revealed a hypothesis regarding the purpose of the bomb. According to the police hypothesis, Lors Doukaiev constructed a letter bomb, which was meant to explode upon opening. The bomb would have the same effect as a fragmentation grenade. It is speculated, that Jyllands-Posten in Århus would have been the target of said letter bomb.

Despite Lors Doukaiev's continued claims of innocence, a unanimous panel of judges found him guilty of attempted terrorism, and on 31 May 2011 he was sentenced to 12 years in prison. In April 2013, he was extradited to Belgium.
