= Islamisk Trossamfund =

Danish Muslim association

The Islamic Society in Denmark (Danish: Islamisk Trossamfund) is a Muslim religious organisation in Denmark. It was founded by Ahmad Abu Laban. The organisation played a significant role in bringing international Muslim attention to the Jyllands-Posten Muhammad cartoons controversy, distributing a 43-page dossier, in order to raise awareness in the Middle-East about the cartoons.

The organisation claims that all Muslims in Denmark are members, regardless of whether they have declared themselves as members. (as of 2005, there are about 180,000 Muslims in Denmark). The organisation arranges weekly prayers on Fridays, which are regularly attended by over 500 people.

Abu Laban died on February 1, 2007, aged 60.
