= Radio Holger =

Danish radio station

Radio Holger was a Danish radio station transmitting in Metropolitan Copenhagen, Denmark.

The radio station was a small and local radio station, which has become notable for being critical towards Islam and Islam's influence in Denmark and the rest of the world. It was closed down by court order in 2009 due to several and repeated racist remarks, punishable by art. 266 b of the Danish Penal Code.

== Sources ==
- TV Syd
- Mediesekretariatet (PDF)
