= Jyllandsposten =

Daily newspaper in Denmark

- Jyllandsposten (cover of 30 July 2011)
- Type: Daily newspaper
- Format: Tabloid
- Owner: Jyllands-Postens Fond
- Publisher: JP/Politikens Hus A/S
- Editor: Christina Agger
- Founded: 2 October 1871; 155 years ago
- Political alignment: Liberal conservatism Conservative People's Party (until 1938)
- Language: Danish
- Headquarters: Aarhus C, Denmark
- Website: jyllands-posten.dk

Jyllandsposten (Danish pronunciation: [ˈjylænsˌpʰʌstn̩]; lit. 'The Jutland Post'; formerly styled as Jyllands-Posten), commonly shortened to JP, is a Danish daily broadsheet newspaper. It is based in Aarhus C, Jutland, and with a weekday circulation of approximately 120,000 copies.

The foundation behind the newspaper, Jyllands-Postens Fond, defines it as an independent (centre-right) newspaper. The paper officially supported the Conservative People's Party until 1938.

In 2005–06, the newspaper published cartoons that depicted the Islamic prophet Muhammad which sparked violent protests around the world, and led to several attempted terrorist plots against the newspaper or its employees.

== History ==
The newspaper was founded in 1871 and issued its first copy on 2 October of that year. Originally, the name Jyllandsposten (in one word) was used, the hyphen being adopted in 1945. The former name was introduced in 1969. In 2026, the newspaper went back to its original name Jyllandsposten.

Jyllandsposten quickly became one of Jutland's most modern newspapers and secured an exclusive access to government telegraph wires between 21:00 and midnight every day. This enabled Jyllandsposten to publish news one day earlier than most of its competitors. Gradually the paper expanded, enlarging its format and adding more and more pages. The first issues had only contained four pages. In 1889 it abandoned the traditional Gothic script in favour of the Latin script used today. Gothic script had been abolished by the Danish spelling reform of 1875, but was still in wide use.

Politically, the paper supported the Højre ("Right") party – which became the Conservative People's Party in 1915. The paper advocated business interests and strongly opposed socialism. It was also critical of business monopolies.

In international affairs, it was generally supportive of Britain and critical of Germany, which it considered the only country that "wished to attack Denmark," to quote an 1872 edition. This nationalist sentiment was a reaction to Germany's annexation of large portions of southern Jutland following the Second War of Schleswig in 1864. Editorially the newspaper supported the Danish minority in Germany and advocated for a new border located at the Danevirke. Throughout World War I Jyllandsposten continued its verbal attacks on Germany despite the government's policy of neutrality in the conflict. In 1918, the newspaper was outlawed in Germany.

=== 1920s–1930s ===
In 1929, the paper established an office in Copenhagen, and established a corporation with The Times. In 1931, the paper was acquired by a joint stock company whose main investor became editor-in-chief. In 1934 the newspaper began to use photographs in its layouts. Foreign news stories were supplied by Ritzau, The Times, and the Daily Telegraph.

During the 1920s and 1930s, the editorial line of the paper was right-wing Conservative. The paper expressed its sympathy for a number of conservative issues, most notably increasing the size of the Danish military, which had experienced a massive cut in funds by the Social Democratic government. Another issue was support of the Danish minority in Germany. The paper expressed its admiration for the authoritarian regimes of Italy and Germany on several occasions, a line assumed by many European newspapers.

In 1922, the newspaper expressed its admiration for Benito Mussolini, who had just assumed office: The very strong man, that Mussolini undoubtedly is, is exactly what the misruled Italian people need. In 1933, the newspaper advocated that Denmark follow Germany's example and replace petty party politics with the stability of an authoritarian regime. The paper considered the German Weimar republic to be a failure because of its lack of stability, and was sympathetic to Adolf Hitler's coming to power and the shutting down of democratic institutions. In March 1933, the paper wrote: Only dry tears will be cried at the grave of the Weimar Republic ... As odd as it may sound, the only 12-year-old German constitution with its one-chamber-system, its low electoral age—20 years—and proportional representation is already antiquated. The editorial of 17 May 1933, stated that ... democratic rule by the people, as we know it, is a luxury which can be afforded in good times when the economy is favorable. But restoring the economy after many years of lavish spending requires a firm hand...

On 15 November 1938, the editorial commented on the Kristallnacht with the words: "When one has studied the Jewish question in Europe for decades, the animosity towards the Jews is to a certain extent understandable, even if we look past the racial theories, that mean so much in the national socialist world view [...] We know, that tens of thousands of Jews condemn the Jewish business sharks, the Jewish pornography speculators and the Jewish terrorists. But still, it can not be denied, that the experiences which the Germans—as many other continental peoples—have had with regards to the Jews, form a certain basis for their persecution. One must give Germany, that they have a right to dispose of their Jews."

A front-page story in 1938 was an open letter to Mussolini criticizing the persecution of Jews, written by Kaj Munk, a prominent priest and playwright, who himself had though previously been sympathetic towards Mussolini and Hitler. In 1939, the paper rebuked the Danish government for signing a German-Danish treaty of non-aggression.

In Jyllandsposten's own history of the paper, published on its website, the story of Kaj Munk's open letter to Mussolini and the paper's opposition to the Danish-German non-aggression treaty are mentioned, but not its sympathies towards Fascism and Nazism. The paper states: JP in this period turned itself firmly against the Soviet Union and world communism, while still maintaining a distance towards Germany, especially with its demands for a strengthened Danish military, and its support for the Danish minority in Southern Schleswig. In 1939 the paper, in opposition to the Copenhagen papers, went against the Danish-German non-aggression treaty.

=== 1940–present ===
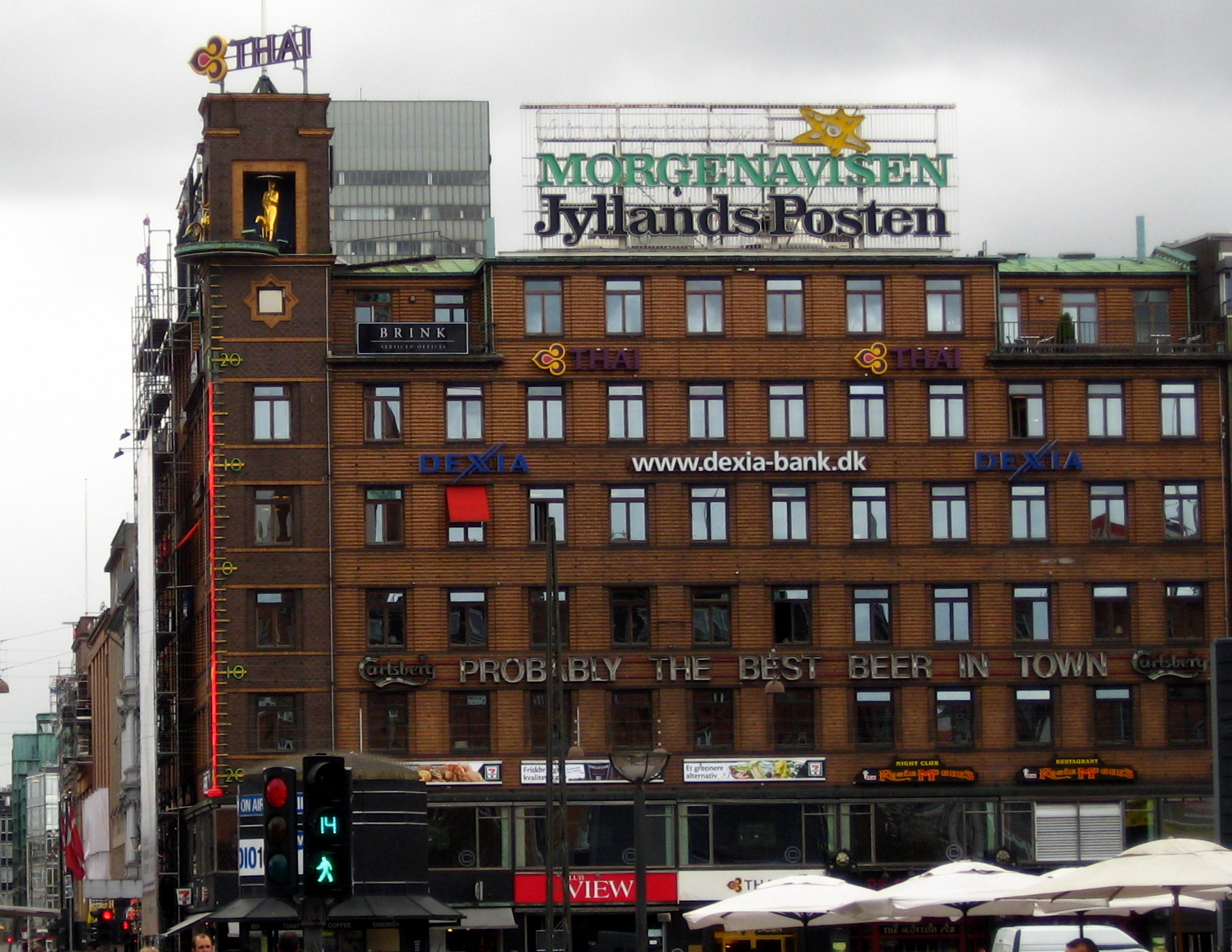
Jyllandsposten advertisement in Copenhagen

Circulation almost doubled during World War II, despite censorship and paper rationing. The number of copies rose from 24,000 to 46,000. The edition announcing the Liberation of Denmark sold 102,000 copies. A number of the paper's employees were involved in the Danish resistance movement against the German occupation of Denmark. After the war, the paper continued to grow, and its ties and sympathy to business interests and industries grew stronger. The paper's nationalist-conservative line was replaced by a line supporting economic liberalism.

In 1954, Jyllandsposten became the first newspaper in Denmark to use colour photos in its layouts. In 1956, the paper implemented the Danish spelling reform of 1948, although headlines were written in old style until 1965.

In 1959, First Secretary of the Communist Party Nikita Khrushchev reportedly cancelled an official visit to Denmark, on the grounds that Jyllandsposten had published a number of articles highly critical of the Soviet Union. Jyllandsposten's editorial line remained staunchly anti-Communist.

Jyllandsposten was affected by a series of strikes in 1956 and between 1973 and 1977. In 1977, the paper left the Union of Danish Employers, following a three-week-long strike against the introduction of new labour-saving equipment. In 1971, the paper bought out the joint stock company controlling it, and it has since been owned by a foundation. In the 1980s, the newspaper gradually increased its number of foreign correspondents, until finally stationing more than 20 journalists around the world.

In 1982, Jyllandsposten's Sunday edition became the largest Sunday paper in Denmark. The paper established offices in Denmark's 10 largest cities. The 1990s were marked by a struggle with Berlingske Tidende which was seeking to expand its circulation in Jutland. In response, Jyllandsposten began issuing a special version of the paper in Copenhagen. In 1994, the weekly edition became the biggest daily morning-newspaper in Denmark with a circulation of 153,000. In the period of 1995–96, the daily had a circulation of 161,000 copies. An internet edition was launched in January 1996 as the second Danish online media (after Ingeniøren), and is the most visited Danish internet news site. In 2001 a number of journalists left Jyllandsposten and launched the free distribution daily MetroXpress in cooperation with a Swedish media company. In 2003, Jyllandsposten merged with the rival publisher of Politiken and Ekstra Bladet when the companies of the papers merged. However, the three newspapers maintain their editorial independence.

Current members of the board of trustees include two notable Danish rightwing intellectuals, David Gress and history professor Bent Jensen.

In 2012, Jyllands-Posten Foundation became a founding member of the European Press Prize.

== Ownership ==
Since 1 January 2003, Jyllandsposten has been owned and published by JP/Politikens Hus A/S. JP/Politikens Hus is owned in equal parts by Jyllands-Posten Holding A/S and A/S Politiken Holding, the holding companies of Jyllandsposten and Politiken respectively. The sole shareholder of Jyllands-Posten Holding is the private foundation Jyllands-Postens Fond. Established in 1971, the fund's mission is to support the political and editorial independence of Jyllandsposten.

== Chief-in-editors ==
- 1972 – 1974: Ole Bernt Henriksen
- 1976 – 1984: Laust Jensen
- 1985 – 1990: Asger Nørgaard Larsen
- 1992: Jørgen Schleimann
- 1993 – 2003: Jørgen Ejbøl
- 2003 – 2008: Carsten Juste
- 2008 – 2016: Jørn Mikkelsen
- 2016 – 2023: Jacob Nybroe
- 2024 – 2026: Marchen Neel Gjertsen
- 2026 – : Christina Agger

== Sections and features ==
On a daily basis, Jyllandsposten has at least one section dedicated to business news in addition to its main news section. Other more specialised supplementary sections are published on a weekly basis. Starting on 5 January 2006, most of these supplements (not including business ones) have been printed in a tabloid format half the size of the broadsheet sections. They have a relatively colourful layout and are referred to as avismagasiner ("newspaper magazines").

Supplementary sections ("avismagasiner")
Day	Sections	Description
Monday	Sport	Sports
Tuesday	International	International news and analysis
Wednesday	Forbrug	Consumer guides and reviews
Thursday	KulturWeekend	In-depth analysis of culture, often in relation to politics and international events (Jyllandsposten's additional newspapers that viewed Mohammed cartoons)
Friday	Tour	Automotive
Friday	Must*	Men's magazine
Friday	Viva*	Women's magazine
Saturday	Explorer	Travelling and leisure
Sunday	Living	Furnishing, home and lifestyle

* Must and Viva are not published on a weekly basis, but rather 10 times a year each, always on Fridays.

=== Comic strips ===
Daily comic strips in Jyllandsposten are Ziggy and Fred Basset (known as Freddie in Danish); the Danish comic Poeten og Lillemor was previously featured, but cancelled some time after the death of its creator, Jørgen Mogensen.

=== Website ===
Since 1996, Jyllandsposten has also operated a news website. The website features a section of English-language news, supplied by The Copenhagen Post, while the Danish version of Computerworld supplies much of the technology-related content. PDF editions of the printed newspaper from the recent few years are available to subscribers. A separate portal for business news, Erhverv På Nettet (epn.dk), was launched in October 2006; the main website now refers to epn.dk for business news, and epn.dk back to Jyllandsposten's main site (as well as Ekstra Bladet's) for general news.

== Political line ==
=== Immigration ===
Jyllandsposten does not present a consistently pro- or anti-migrant stance relative to other Danish newspapers. However, it has been criticized as being anti-migrant after a few controversial incidents.

In 2002, the Danish Council of the Press criticised the newspaper for breaching its regulations on race while reporting on three Somalis charged with a crime. The relevant regulation was: "Any mention of family relations, occupation, race, nationality, faith or relationship to an organisation ought to be avoided, unless this has a direct relevance to the case,"

Jyllandsposten published a story alleging asylum fraud by resident Palestinian refugees in Denmark. This contributed to the electoral success of Anders Fogh Rasmussen on 20 November 2001, whose political party campaigned for reduced immigration. The story was found to be unsupported and resulted in the sacking of the editor-in-chief Ulrik Haagerup on 12 December 2001 (Politiken, Berlingske Tidende, Information, B.T., 13 December 2001). However, Jyllandsposten maintained that the dismissal of Haagerup had nothing to do with his responsibility for the articles in question (editorial on 16 December 2001). According to Weekendavisen, a newspaper that pretty much shares the political line of Jyllandsposten, the real reason for Haagerup's dismissal was a disagreement about the employment strategy (21 December 2001).

The 2004 report on Denmark by the European Network Against Racism (ENAR), an organisation of NGOs funded partly by the European Commission, concluded that the Danish media devoted an excessive proportion of their time to the problems posed by immigrants, and most often Islamic immigrants, while often ignoring the problems that these immigrants face. According to the ENAR report, out of 382 JP articles on immigrants, 212 were negative, a share similar to other Danish newspapers. The ENAR report holds newspapers such as Jyllandsposten to blame for the rise of the anti-immigrant right-wing in Danish politics.

A journalist employed at Jyllandsposten won a second prize in 2005 in an EU wide competition for journalists for diversity and against discrimination. The compilation of several articles "The Integration Paper" by Orla Borg was awarded the second prize.

=== Pro-Israel ===
On 5 January 2008, the newspaper published an editorial expressing the views of the newspaper where they give unreserved support for Israel's war in Gaza. The newspaper starts by telling its readers they are happy that those in the international community who are important are not condemning the Israeli attacks on Gaza. The newspaper continues with saying that the war is not complicated at all and blames Hamas and Palestinians for the Israeli attacks. The newspaper also states that Israel should avoid killing civilians but continues "But war is war. Civilians have always died in wars."

== Controversies ==
=== Muhammad cartoons ===
The paper gained international attention after its controversial publication in September 2005 of 12 cartoons depicting Islam and Muhammad; one of these showed Muhammad with a bomb in his turban. This drew protests from Muslims living in Denmark, followed in early 2006 by protests throughout the Muslim world.

The newspaper was accused of misusing freedom of speech by Muslim groups and a number of ethnic Danish intellectuals. The Muhammad cartoons controversy resulted in the withdrawal of the Libyan, Saudi and Syrian ambassadors from Denmark, as well as consumer boycotts of Danish products in a number of Islamic countries.

The newspaper had apologised for offending Muslims, but maintained that it had the right to print the cartoons.

In April 2003, the same editor on the newspaper rejected a set of unsolicited Jesus cartoons submitted by Christoffer Zieler on the basis that they were offensive. The Muhammed cartoons were explicitly solicited by the editor. Ahmed Akkari, spokesman for the Danish-based European Committee for Prophet Honouring, saw this as a double standard.

Maiduguri, Nigeria; Central Africa, On 18 February 2006, riots related to the Muhammad cartoons published by the Danish newspaper Jyllandsposten left at least 15 people dead, and resulted in the destruction of approximately 12 churches. Soldiers and police quelled the riots, and the government temporarily imposed a curfew.

In February 2008, following the arrest of three men who allegedly had conspired to kill one of the cartoonists, Jyllandsposten and 16 other Danish newspapers republished the cartoon in question to "show their commitment to freedom of speech".

A Pakistani-American terrorist, David Headley (born Daood Sayed Gilani), 48, and Tahawwur Hussain Rana, 48, were charged by U.S. federal authorities in Chicago, in complaints unsealed on 27 October 2009, of plotting against the employees of the newspaper in Copenhagen. Headley was accused of traveling to Denmark to scout the building of the Jyllandsposten and a nearby synagogue, for a terrorist attack.

A small explosion at Hotel Jørgensen in Copenhagen on 10 September 2010 was described by the police as an accident with a letter bomb that was meant to be sent to Jyllandsposten.

In September 2010, a 37-year-old Iraqi Kurd arrested in Norway earlier that year and suspected of planning unspecified terrorist attacks confessed that one of his targets was Jyllandsposten.

Five men were arrested in December 2010 in the direct process of carrying out the attack. The arrest was due to the men being under tight surveillance, and covert investigation from the Swedish and Danish intelligence services in a successful cooperation. The arrested men including a 37-year-old Swedish citizen of Tunisian origin living in Stockholm, a 44-year-old Tunisian, a 29-year-old Lebanese-born man, and a 26-year-old Iraqi asylum-seeker living in Copenhagen—for allegedly planning "to kill as many of the people present as possible" in the Jyllandsposten Copenhagen newsdesk.

=== COVID-19 outbreak in China ===
In January 2020, during the COVID-19 pandemic in mainland China, the newspaper received international attention when it published a cartoon depicting the Chinese flag with yellow virus-like figures instead of the usual yellow stars. Unlike the Muhammad cartoons, the illustration of the Chinese flag was not published in the satire section nor was it intended as a provocation, but was published along an article about the outbreak in China.

The Chinese embassy in Denmark demanded an official apology from the newspaper. Danish Prime Minister Mette Frederiksen refused to apologize on behalf of the Danish government, declaring that there is freedom of speech in Denmark. Other Danish newspapers, although some of them regarded the illustration as impolite, supported Jyllandsposten, noting that Danish newspapers operate under Danish law, not based on intimidation from a non-democratic country, and also pointed out that few would have seen the illustration if not for the actions of the Chinese embassy. The illustrator received numerous threats, and social media platforms were flooded by illustrations of the Danish flag that had been edited to included feces, texts like alle jeres familier døde ("all your families are dead") and similar mockery in what experts regarded as a coordinated action, much of it spread by newly started profiles that appeared to be automated.

The attempt of forcing Jyllandsposten to apologize was similar to several earlier cases in Scandinavia where Chinese authorities had attempted to discredit the local media, especially ones that had focused on sensitive Chinese matters like the Xinjiang re-education camps and the imprisonment of book publisher and writer Gui Minhai. Around the same time as the publication of the drawing in Jyllandsposten, similar drawings were published independently in Belgium, the Netherlands and Mexico, but they were not met by the same response by the Chinese authorities.

== Public perception ==
=== References in fiction ===
- In the novel Den hårde frugt (1977, winner of "Kritikerprisen") by the celebrated Aarhus author Tage Skou-Hansen, a group of left-wing terrorists plan to blow up the house of Jyllandsposten. The main character, Holger Mikkelsen, a well-off lawyer known from Skou-Hansen's other novels, is confronted with his own past in the resistance movement during the German occupation of Denmark.
- The novel Stasiland (2001) by Flemming Christian Nielsen is widely perceived to be a satirical roman à clef account of Jyllandsposten. According to the publishing house: "The newspaper views its mission to praise democracy and freedom, but are they mere words meant to hide that its reporters are the victims of a creeping totalitarianism?"

== See also ==
- History of journalism#Denmark
- List of non-English newspapers with English language subsections
