= Ahmed Akkari =

Danish political activist

Ahmed Akkari (born 1978) (Arabic: أحمد عكاري) is a Danish political activist who in 2005 became known for his involvement in the Jyllands-Posten Muhammad cartoons controversy.

He has since appologized for his role and has cut ties with the islamist community. In books, speaches and interviews he now criticizes the same community for harming the integration of Muslims in the West.

== Early years ==
Ahmed Akkari was born in Lebanon in 1978. In 1985 the Akkaris family came to Denmark, where they obtained asylum, but returned to Lebanon in 1990. Upon their return to Denmark a year later they found they did not qualify as refugees again, because the Lebanese Civil War was over. With the support of some Danish local media, which featured young Ahmed as a model immigrant, they were granted a humanitarian residency permit in 1994.

Ahmed Akkari grew up in a secular family. His parents insisted on living in the countryside, far away from religious influence. However, a family friend took the young Ahmed to the mosque in Danmarksgade in Aalborg, where he became absorbed in Islamic studies. He was soon allowed to speak in the mosque and was widely recognized for his ability to convey Islam in both Danish and Arabic. During the following years Akkaris status in the islamist community grew and he started functioning as an imam in mosques all over Denmark.

Ahmed Akkari subsequently went to high school and trained as a teacher in Århus. He later obtained a masters degree in educational sociology. He became a Danish citizen in 2005 which made him eligible to be evacuated from Lebanon again in 2006.

== Cartoons controversy ==
During the Jyllands-Posten Muhammad cartoons controversy Akkari acted as a spokesman of the Danish-based European Committee for Prophet Honouring and spokesman of the Islamisk Trossamfund (Islamic Society in Denmark). According to Akkari he was chosen for this role mainly because of his language skills.

=== Controversial statements ===
In a documentary published by French television channel France 2 on 23 March 2006, Akkari was recorded - using a hidden camera - in conversation with his friend - fellow imam Sheikh Raed Hlayhel.

During the conversation the two talked about what would happen if the controversial Danish right wing politician Naser Khader became minister of integration. Akkari says"...If he (Khader) becomes minister of integration, isn't it possible that a couple (of people) would come to blow up him and his ministry?...".

Some considered this statement a threat while Akkari himself maintained that it was simply a speculation with no ill intent.

A fellow party member from Khader's party Elsebeth Gerner Nielsen reported Ahmed Akkari to the police. The following day, 24 March 2006, Islamisk Trossamfund announced that Ahmed Akkari was no longer spokesman for the organization.

The Police found no evidence of wrongdoing and Ahmed Akkari was never charged with a crime following the incident.

Following the Muhammed cartoons controversy Ahmed Akkari stopped working as an imam and moved to Greenland where he lived a quiet life outside the public spotlight while working as a teacher.

== Apology ==
In August 2013, Akkari came forward in a series of articles - primarily in the Danish newspapers *BT* and *Berlingske Tidende*. In these articles, he strongly disavowed his past actions as an imam and warned about the consequences of growing radicalization in the Danisk muslim community. Based on his own experiences he revealed how a large number of mosques and imams secretly preach a very orthodox version of Islam that foster opposition toward Denmark and Western values.

At the same time, he issued a public apology to individuals including politician Naser Khader, cartoonist Kurt Westergaard, and former prime minister Anders Fogh Rasmussen - all of whom had faced threats in connection with the debate surrounding the Muhammad cartoons.

Akkari’s statements led to threats against his safety, forcing him to go into hiding with police protection before returning to Greenland in the summer of 2014.

Akkari was married to a Lebanese woman and has two sons and a daughter.[2][6] He became a Danish citizen in 2005.

Since his return to the public spotlight in 2013 Ahmed Akkari has published books and appeared in articles elaborating his view on the islamist community.

In 2016 he appeared in the award winning documentary "The Mosques Behind the Veil." In the documentary two undercover moles infiltrate some of the mosques critiziced by Akkari. The recordings confirmed that the mosques secrety warned muslims about integration and encouraged them to follow islamic sharia law even if this is in opposition to secular law and western values.
