= Cast off =

Cast off may refer to:

- Cast off (knitting), another term for binding off
- Castoff (publishing), estimating the number of bookbinding signatures required to typeset a manuscript
- Offcasting, a concept in the science fiction of the mathematician Ian Stewart and Jack Cohen
- Cast Offs, a 2009 British television series
