= Juan Andrés (disambiguation) =

Juan Andrés may refer to:

- Juan Andrés (1740–1817), writer, Jesuit and historian
- Juan Andrés (convert), Moorish scholar
- Juan Andres (Burrul), priest and mathematician
