= Extelligence =

Cultural capital available as external media

Extelligence is a term coined by Ian Stewart and Jack Cohen in their 1997 book Figments of Reality. They define it as the cultural capital that is available to us in the form of external media (e.g. tribal legends, folklore, nursery rhymes, books, videotapes, CD-ROMs, etc.)

They contrast extelligence with intelligence, or the knowledge and cognitive processes within the brain. Furthermore, they regard the 'complicity' of extelligence and intelligence as fundamental to the development of consciousness in evolutionary terms for both the species and the individual. 'Complicity' is a combination of complexity and simplicity, and Cohen and Stewart use it to express the interdependent relationship between knowledge-inside-one's-head and knowledge-outside-one's-head that can be readily accessed.

Although Cohen's and Stewart's respective disciplines are biology and mathematics, their description of the complicity of intelligence and extelligence is in the tradition of Jean Piaget, Belinda Dewar and David A. Kolb. Philosophers, notably Popper, have also considered the relation between subjective knowledge (which he calls world 2), objective knowledge (world 1) and the knowledge represented by man-made artifacts (world 3).

One of Cohen and Stewart's contributions is the way they relate, through the idea of complicity, the individual to the sum of human knowledge. From the mathematics of complexity and game theory, they use the idea of phase space and talk about extelligence space. There is a total phase space (intelligence space) for the human race, which consists of everything that can be known and represented. Within this there is a smaller set of what is known at any given time. Cohen and Stewart propose the idea that each individual can access the parts of the extelligence space with which their intelligence is complicit.

In other words, there has to be, at some level, an appreciation of what is out there and what it means. Much of this 'appreciation' falls into the category of tacit knowledge and social and cultural learning. As an example, a dictionary may contain definitions of many words, but only some subset of those definitions might be understood by any particular reader.

== See also ==
- Extended mind thesis
- Externalism
- Intelligence augmentation
