= Art of Mentoring =

- Edited by: John Donatich
- Country: America
- Language: English
- Genre: self-help books, guide books
- Publisher: Basic Books
- Published: 2001–2008
- No. of books: 15

The Art of Mentoring series is a series of books published by Basic Books from 2001 to 2008, beginning with Alan Dershowitz's Letters to a Young Lawyer and Christopher Hitchens' Letters to a Young Contrarian. The books were all titled in the form "Letters to a Young ____", in the spirit of Rainer Maria Rilke's book Letters to a Young Poet. They were meant to be relatively short guides to various occupations or life paths for someone starting out in that field, from the point of view of an expert.

== Creator ==
The series was the brainchild of John Donatich, who was the publisher at Basic Books from 1997 to 2003.

== Books in the series ==
- Letters to a Young Contrarian by Christopher Hitchens (2001)
- Letters to a Young Lawyer by Alan Dershowitz (2001)
- Letters to a Young Golfer by Carl Vigeland and Bob Duval (2002)
- Letters to a Young Conservative by Dinesh D'Souza (2002)
- Letters to a Young Activist by Todd Gitlin (2003)
- Letters to a Young Therapist by Mary Pipher (2003)
- Letters to a Young Chef by Daniel Boulud (2003)
- Letters to a Young Gymnast by Nadia Comăneci (2004)
- Letters to a Young Catholic by George Weigel (2004)
- Letters to a Young Actor: A Universal Guide to Performance by Robert Brustein (2005)
- Letters to a Young Mathematician by Ian Stewart (2006)
- Letters to a Young Journalist by Samuel G. Freedman (2006)
- Letters to a Young Evangelical by Tony Campolo (2006)
- Treatment Kind and Fair: Letters to a Young Doctor by Perri Klass (2007)
- A Time to Every Purpose: Letters to a Young Jew by Jonathan Sarna (2008)

== Similar titles ==
Other books, like Wynton Marsalis's To a Young Jazz Musician: Letters from the Road (2004), William Sloane Coffin's Letters to a Young Doubter (2005), Hill Harper's Letters to a Young Brother (2006) and Jonathan Kozol's Letters to a Young Teacher (2007), though they share the structure and naming style of the series, and may have been inspired by it, were not part of the Art of Mentoring series.
