= The Science of Discworld IV: Judgement Day =

2013 book by Terry Pratchett, Ian Stewart and Jack Cohen

- Authors: Terry Pratchett, Ian Stewart & Jack Cohen
- Cover artist: Paul Kidby
- Language: English
- Series: Discworld; 4th science book
- Subject: Evolution theory Scientific theories Characters Unseen University Staff, Marjorie Dawes, Rincewind, Havelock Vetinari Locations Roundworld, Discworld
- Genre: Fantasy
- Published: 2013 (Ebury Press)
- Publication place: United Kingdom
- ISBN: 978-0091949792
- Preceded by: The Science of Discworld III: Darwin's Watch

The Science of Discworld IV: Judgement Day is a book set on the Discworld, by Terry Pratchett, Ian Stewart and Jack Cohen. It is the sequel to The Science of Discworld, The Science of Discworld II: The Globe and The Science of Discworld III: Darwin's Watch.

As with the first three volumes, the book alternates between a Discworld story and a serious scientific discussion.

"The Science of Discworld series is arguably unique in style: we call it fact/fantasy fusion. The scenario allows serious discussion of solid, current science, without distorting it into ‘yes, pigs really could fly given GM wings’ or whatever. All three books entered the Sunday Times bestseller lists, and the third made it to number one, so we managed to reach a significantly large audience. Perhaps the most gratifying comment came from a Times reviewer: ‘the hard science is as gripping as the fiction’. Which is just as it should be." (Prof. Ian Stewart)

The title may sound apocalyptic, but the book does not reflect this. Rather, the Discworld Story details a trial before Lord Vetinari who will pass Judgement. The scientific sections of the book mostly deal with religious beliefs, especially around the creation of the earth and its peoples.

== Plot summary ==
In the Discworld story an attempt to perform a magical feat overseen by Ponder Stibbons results in a magical accident which sees the Roundworld librarian, Marjorie Daw, sucked into the Discworld from her library in England. Meanwhile, the High Priests of Omnia (see Small Gods) have declared that, since Omnism has always speculated that the Discworld is, in fact, spherical and Roundworld is, clearly, a spherical world (though one that is currently in a glass container on a small shelf in the Unseen University) it proves that Omnism was always correct and use this as "evidence" that Roundworld should belong to Omnia.

The wizards of Unseen University, especially Mustrum Ridcully, The Dean (now Archchancellor of the new Brazeneck University), Ponder Stibbons and The Librarian reject this, since Roundworld was created by accident when the Dean twiddled his fingers in a pile of raw universal firmament some books previously. The arguments are brought before Lord Vetinari to judge, who ultimately decides in favour of the university.

== Ideas and themes ==
In the discussion section Cohen and Stewart re-examine the theory of evolution and the changes in the idea over the years. They also explore how scientific theories happen in general, and how they differ from other ways of thinking. They also point out how many religions have created Creation stories (some remarkably similar) and God(s) and how this thinking can be quite introspective suggesting that the existence of the universe is purely for the benefit of human beings as opposed to most scientific belief that the universe would still exist even if human beings did not exist.

== Reception ==
Sandra Scholes reviewed the book for SF Site, concluding that " it is just a chapter driven comedy which has science revealed in it... For anyone into science fiction and science in general, this is the sort of light-hearted book to pick up as it asks (nearly) all of the questions that many want to have answered".

The reviewer for AudioFile noted that "it's the sounds of absolute glee and discovery, along with charming English accents, that Stevens and Briggs bring to the proceedings that make these books irresistible".

A. S. Byatt reviewed the book for New Statesman, writing that "One of the most pleasing things about Pratchett, Stewart and Cohen’s book is the way the authors demonstrate that we don’t understand even what we think we understand".

In a review for The Sydney Morning Herald, the reviewer called the book a successful continuation of the series.

The book was also reviewed by Duncan Lunan for Interzone.

The book also received a review in Publishers Weekly and the Belfast Telegraph.
