= From Here to Infinity =

From Here to Infinity may refer to:

- From Here to Infinity (album), a 1987 album by Lee Ranaldo
- From Here to Infinity (book), a 1996 book by Ian Stewart
