= The Collapse of Chaos =

Book by Jack Cohen and Ian Stewart

- Softcover edition
- Author: Jack Cohen and Ian Stewart
- Language: English
- Subject: scientific explanation, complexity theory
- Publisher: Penguin Books
- Publication date: 1994
- Publication place: United Kingdom
- Pages: 495
- ISBN: 978-0-670-84983-3
- OCLC: 247326335

The Collapse of Chaos: Discovering Simplicity in a Complex World (1994) is a book about complexity theory and the nature of scientific explanation written by biologist Jack Cohen and mathematician Ian Stewart.

In this book Cohen and Stewart give their ideas on chaos theory, particularly on how the simple leads to the complex, and conversely, how the complex leads to the simple, and argue for a need for contextual explanation in science as a complement to reduction. This book dovetails with other books written by the Cohen-Stewart team, particularly Figments of Reality.

As with other Cohen-Stewart books, topics are illustrated with humorous science fiction snippets dealing with a fictional alien intelligence, the Zarathustrians, whom Cohen and Stewart use as metaphors of the human mind itself.

== Reception ==
Next Generation commented, "Although the book assumes you have zero knowledge of science (and thus is a little patronizing in the early chapters), it presents the concepts of Complexity Theory as well as anything we've seen."

=== Additional reviews ===
- Casti, John L. (21 July 1994). "Why is anything ever simple?" (PDF). Nature. 370 (6486): 189. Bibcode:1994Natur.370..189C. doi:10.1038/370189a0. S2CID 4317485.
- Regis, Ed (12 June 1994). "The World Made Easy". The New York Times.
- THE COLLAPSE OF CHAOS by Jack Cohen, Ian Stewart | Kirkus Reviews.
- "Nonfiction Book Review: The Collapse of Chaos: 2discovering Simplicity in a Complex World by Jack Cohen, Author, Ian Stewart, With Viking Books $23.95 (512p) ISBN 978-0-670-84983-3". PublishersWeekly.com.
- Tait, Stephanie (2010). "A review of "The Collapse of Chaos: Discovering Simplicity in a Complex World," by Jack Cohen and Ian Stewart, 1995". Complicity. 7 (2). doi:10.29173/cmplct8955.
