= The Cartoons that Shook the World =

2009 book by Jytte Klausen

- Author: Jytte Klausen
- Language: English
- Genre: Cultural studies
- Publisher: Yale University Press
- Publication date: 2009
- Publication place: United States
- Pages: 230
- ISBN: 978-0300124729
- OCLC: 488656926

The Cartoons that Shook the World is a 2009 book by Brandeis University professor Jytte Klausen about the Jyllands-Posten Muhammad cartoons controversy. Klausen contends that the controversy was deliberately stoked up by people with vested interests on all sides, and argues against the view that it was based on a cultural misunderstanding about the depiction of Muhammad. The book itself caused controversy before its publication when Yale University Press removed all images from the book, including the controversial cartoons themselves and some other images of Muhammad.

== Publishing history ==
The book was scheduled to be published in November 2009 by Yale University Press. Prior to publication, officials at the press decided to remove all images of Muhammad from the forthcoming book, including the controversial cartoons and a number of historical images of Muhammad from both Muslim and non-Muslim sources, including a 19th-century engraving by Gustave Doré showing Muhammad being tormented in a scene from Dante's Inferno. According to the Yale Daily News, the story first broke in The New York Times on August 13, 2009.

The press defended its decision, releasing a statement explaining that the university had consulted counter-terrorism officials, the highest-level Muslim official at the United Nations, foreign ambassadors from Muslim countries, and Islamic studies scholars, and that they had "all" voiced serious fears about provoking more violence.

Sheila Blair, Calderwood Professor of Fine Arts at Boston College and an expert on the art of the Islamic world was one of the authorities consulted by the Yale University Press. She told The Guardian that she had "strongly urged" the press to publish the images since, "To deny that such images were made is to distort the historical record and to bow to the biased view of some modern zealots who would deny that others at other times and places perceived and illustrated Muhammad in different ways."

Boston College professor Jonathan Laurence, co-author of Integrating Islam: Political and Religious Challenges in Contemporary France, has said that he told the press that it should reproduce the original Jyllands-Posten newspaper page that included the cartoon. "I was consulted by the press about the decision whether or not to publish. I suggested that they publish the newspaper page in its entirety as documentary evidence of the episode being discussed", he told The Times. "I actually know another professor who was also consulted and also told them to go ahead, but do it in a responsible manner."

Cary Nelson, the president of the American Association of University Professors issued a statement describing the decision not to publish the illustrations as prior restraint. "What is to stop publishers from suppressing an author's words if it appears they may offend religious fundamentalists or groups threatening violence?" he said. "We deplore this decision and its potential consequences." Nelson accused the press of acceding to the "anticipated demands" of "terrorists."

According to The Bookseller, the press has come under "heavy criticism" for its decision to censor the illustrations.

Christopher Hitchens took issue with both the decision to expunge the cartoons and with the statement by the director of the press, John Donatich, who told The New York Times that while he has "never blinked" before in the face of controversy, "when it came between that and blood on my hands, there was no question." Hitchens compared this line of reasoning to the reasoning of people who "argue that women who won't wear the veil have 'provoked' those who rape or disfigure them ... and now Yale has adopted that 'logic' as its own." Concluding, "What a cause of shame that the campus of Nathan Hale should have pre-emptively run up the white flag and then cringingly taken the blood guilt of potential assassins and tyrants upon itself."

According to Professor Klausen, "My book is an academic book with footnotes and the notion that it would set off civil war in Nigeria is laughable", she added that her book has become part of "a battle over the limits of freedom of speech".

== Publication of the expunged images ==
In November 2009, Voltaire Press published all of the images expunged by Yale University in a book entitled Muhammad: The "Banned" Images by Professor Gary Hull of Duke University. According to Hull, the new publication is "a 'picture book' – or errata to the bowdlerized version of Klausen's book."

== Thesis ==
According to the publisher,

Jytte Klausen interviewed politicians in the Middle East, Muslim leaders in Europe, the Danish editors and cartoonists, and the Danish imam who started the controversy. Following the winding trail of protests across the world, she deconstructs the arguments and motives that drove the escalation of the increasingly globalized conflict. She concludes that the Muslim reaction to the cartoons was not—as was commonly assumed—a spontaneous emotional reaction arising out of the clash of Western and Islamic civilizations. Rather it was orchestrated, first by those with vested interests in elections in Denmark and Egypt, and later by Islamic extremists seeking to destabilize governments in Pakistan, Lebanon, Libya, and Nigeria. Klausen shows how the cartoon crisis was, therefore, ultimately a political conflict rather than a colossal cultural misunderstanding.

—

== See also ==
- The Jewel of Medina
- Jyllands-Posten Muhammad cartoons controversy
