= Jytte Klausen =

Danish political scientist

Personal details
- Occupation: Lawrence A. Wien Professor of International Cooperation, Affiliate at the Center for European Studies at Harvard University, Author, Western Jihadism Project, Founder
- Profession: Professor
- Website: https://www.brandeis.edu/facultyguide/person.html?emplid=8cfea83c0a70191751f1d16c96473b7b795d7e0a

Jytte Klausen (born 21 February 1954) is a Danish-born scholar of politics who teaches at Brandeis University in Waltham, Massachusetts as the Lawrence A. Wien Professor of International Cooperation in the Department of Politics. Klausen has also served as an affiliate at the Minda de Gunzburg Center for European Studies at Harvard, among other positions.

Klausen is a graduate of the University of Aarhus in Denmark, and earned her doctorate at the New School for Social Research in New York City. Her background is in comparative historical research with a focus on Western Europe and North America. She also has expertise in domestic and international terrorism, Islam in the West, and immigration and social cohesion.

== Research and work ==
At Brandeis, Klausen has taught undergraduate and graduate courses or classes that have focused on immigration, law and human rights, and religion and secularism through the lens of conflicts over the integration of Islam and Muslims in the West.

Klausen's work has focused on social cohesion and immigration politics in Western Europe and the United States. Her approach is comparative and interdisciplinary with a methodological emphasis on what can best be described as political anthropology. Over the past two decades, she has focused on researching Islamist extremism and terrorism in the West.

Some of Klausen's earlier work was concerned with the way in which European institutions were recalibrating postwar stabilization pacts that had been struck between religious institutions and secular civic and political movements, particularly on the Left, in response to a new wave of immigration occurring largely in the late 1990s. An article published in 2005 in Perspectives on Politics, called “The Re-Politicization of Religion in Europe: The Next Ten Years,” summarized her perspective. Klausen's second single-authored book, "The Islamic Challenge: Politics and Religion in Western Europe" (2005, 2007pb), was based on intensive interviews with Muslim politicians that she conducted in a number of European countries. German and Turkish translations were published in 2006 and 2007 respectively, and rights have been granted to an Arabic translation.

In 2009, controversy arose when Yale University Press decided to expunge reproductions of the cartoons involved in the Jyllands-Posten Muhammad cartoons controversy, along with all other images of Muhammad from a scholarly book entitled "The Cartoons that Shook the World," written by Klausen. This book was a study of the global protests against the Danish newspaper Jyllands-Posten following the publication of twelve satirical drawings portraying Muhammad. Muhammad: The "Banned" Images which the publisher called "a 'picture book' – or errata to the bowdlerized version of Klausen's book" was published in response. A comprehensive list of Klausen's published and cited works can be found under the "Works" section of this page, and on either her Brandeis faculty homepage or the webpage for her research lab, the Western Extremism Project.

In 2006, Klausen founded the Western Jihadism Project (WJP), now part of the Western Extremism Project (WEP), a web-based data portal and research laboratory designed to study Al-Qaeda-inspired terrorist offenders in Western Europe, the Antipodes, Canada, and the United States. The lab has since expanded in 2021 using the same web portal and archive to include work on additional ideologies, which extended the methodologies of the WJP to analyze the development and evolution of right-wing extremist groups, Incels/violent misogynists, Neo-nazis, and other extremist ideologies in Western democracies. Klausen's WEP uses a purpose-built relational database in PostgreSQL to establish a reliable model for radicalization trajectories across extremist ideologies based on an archival collection of publicly sourced data and audio-visual files including: photographs, videos, propaganda, magazines, sermons, court documents, and news reports.

== Awards and accomplishments ==
Klausen has written for Foreign Affairs, the Wall Street Journal, the Boston Globe, and other national and international outlets, as well as being a regular commentator on the BBC, Voice of America, and other U.S. and international media.

For over a decade, Klausen has been involved in the development of 2G computational social science methods for the analysis of networks and recruitment processes. In 2017, she won a $731,000 award alongside collaborators at Colorado State University granted by the National Institute of Justice to develop a risk assessment protocol, her third award from the United States Department of Justice. Klausen's most recent book, "Western Jihadism: A Thirty Year History," traces the development of global jihadist networks in Western democratic nations. In 2022, the book received second place for the Airey Neave Book Prize as one of the most influential books in the reshaping of how we understand intelligence and counterterrorism. She spent 2016-2017 as a fellow at the Woodrow Wilson International Center for Scholars in Washington D.C. working on the manuscript.

In 2007, Klausen also received the Carnegie Scholars’ Award in support of her research on the integration of Muslim faith communities in Europe. In addition, Klausen's article, "Tweeting the Jihad" published in 2015, has had over 70,000 unique downloads and was listed as the fifth most impactful article in medicine, health, STEM and social science with a woman as the lead author over the previous five years. She also holds a number of awards and recognitions from the likes of Brandeis University, Oxford University, Harvard University, the International Centre for the Study of Radicalisation, the United States Institute of Peace, the Bunting Institute, the American Academy in Berlin, and many others.

== Works ==
- Klausen, Jytte. Western Jihadism: A Thirty Year History. Oxford University Press, 2021.
- Klausen, Jytte with Shashika R. Muramudalige, Benjamin W. K. Hung, Anura P. Jayasumana, and Indrakshi Ray. Enhancing investigative pattern detection via inexact matching and graph databases. Transactions on Services Computing, 2021.
- B. W. K. Hung, S. R. Muramudalige, A. P. Jayasumana, J. Klausen, R. Libretti, E. Moloney, P. Renugopalakrishnan. Recognizing Radicalization Indicators in Text Documents Using Human-in-the-Loop Information Extraction and NLP Techniques. 2019 IEEE International Symposium on Technologies for Homeland Security (HST), Woburn, MA. 2019.
- Klausen, Jytte with Alexandra Johnson, Alyssa Kann, Priyanka Renugopalakrishnan, and Yujiao Su. Jihadi Gangs - The New Crime Terror Nexus. Proc. of Exploring Organized Crime-Terror Networks. East China University of Political Science and Law, March 15–16, 2019. Shanghai, China: 2019.
- Freeland, J., Klausen, J., and Pagé, C. A.. "Dynamical Threat Assessment: An Innovative Approach to Preventive Investigations of Violent Extremism and Terrorism." 2019. In M. Herzog-Evans & M. Benbouriche (Eds.), Evidence-Based Work with Violent Extremists: International Implications of French Terrorist Attacks and Responses. (pp. 47–62). Lexington Books (UK).
- Klausen, Jytte. The Myth of Homegrown Terrorism. The Georgetown Security Studies Review, Special Issue: What the New Administration Needs to Know About Terrorism and Counterterrorism, 50-60. 2017.
- Klausen, Jytte. Tweeting the Jihad: Social Media Networks of Western Foreign Fighters in Syria and Iraq. Studies in Conflict and Terrorism, Vol. 38, Iss. 1 (2015), pp. 1–22. 9 December 2014. DOI: 10.1080/1057610X.2014.974948
- Klausen, Jytte. The Cartoons that Shook the World. Yale University Press, 2009.
- Klausen, Jytte. The Islamic Challenge: Politics and Religion in Western Europe. Oxford University Press (UK and US), publication date 27 October 2005.
- Klausen, Jytte. Has Liberalism Failed Women? Assuring Equal Representation in Europe and the United States. Co-edited with Charles S. Maier. Palgrave, 2001.
- Klausen, Jytte. War and Welfare: Europe and the United States, 1945 to the Present. St. Martin's Press (US) and Macmillan (UK), 1998. 2nd edition Palgrave 2001.
- Klausen, Jytte. European Integration in a Social and Historical Perspective, 1850 to the Present. Co-edited with Louise A. Tilly. Rowman & Littlefield, 1997.
