= The Science of Discworld III: Darwin's Watch =

2005 book by Terry Pratchett, Ian Stewart and Jack Cohen

- First edition
- Authors: Terry Pratchett, Ian Stewart & Jack Cohen
- Cover artist: Paul Kidby
- Language: English
- Series: Discworld; 3rd science book
- Subject: evolution theory time travel Scientific theories Characters Unseen University Staff, Charles Darwin, Auditors of Reality Locations Roundworld
- Genre: Fantasy
- Published: 2005 (Ebury Press)
- ISBN: 0-091-89823-4 (hardcover); 0-091-89824-2 (paperback)
- Preceded by: The Science of Discworld II: The Globe
- Followed by: The Science of Discworld IV: Judgement Day

The Science of Discworld III: Darwin's Watch (2005) is a book set on the Discworld, by Terry Pratchett, Ian Stewart and Jack Cohen. It is the sequel to The Science of Discworld and The Science of Discworld II: The Globe. It is followed by The Science of Discworld IV: Judgement Day.

According to Stewart:

As with the first two volumes, the book alternates between a Discworld story and a serious scientific discussion. The Science of Discworld series is arguably unique in style: we call it fact/fantasy fusion. The scenario allows serious discussion of solid, current science, without distorting it into 'yes, pigs really could fly given GM wings' or whatever. All three books entered the Sunday Times bestseller lists, and the third made it to number one, so we managed to reach a significantly large audience. Perhaps the most gratifying comment came from a Times reviewer: 'the hard science is as gripping as the fiction'. Which is just as it should be.

The title refers to William Paley's watchmaker analogy and Richard Dawkins' subsequent description of evolution as the Blind Watchmaker.

== Plot summary ==
In the Discworld story the wizards learn that, once again, the history of Roundworld has changed, resulting in humans failing to leave Earth before the extinction event shown in the earlier books. They discover that the difference from established history was that Charles Darwin wrote a book called Theology of Species, which described how evolution must be controlled by a Creator. This was generally accepted by both religious figures and conservative scientists, and led to a certain stagnation of thought, preventing the eventual invention of the space elevator. When the wizards try to correct this, the potential futures of Roundworld go mad. The possibility of Darwin ever writing the book becomes near zero, with most futures featuring his death or failure to write a book in seemingly improbable—and sometimes downright ridiculous—ways.

The wizards eventually deduce that Roundworld has caught the attention of the Auditors of Reality, who approve of a universe which runs on unthinking rules, and disapprove of humans, who try to make it more like the Discworld. Unlike the elven invasion in The Globe, which suppressed our creativity unthinkingly, this is a deliberate attempt to prevent humans escaping Earth.

While attempting to maintain a timeline where The Origin was written, the wizards inadvertently take Darwin to the Discworld. There they discover that his line of thought was disrupted by an Auditor-advised visit from the Disc's God of Evolution, leading to Theology. After defeating the Auditors the wizards manage to correct this, by explaining the situation to Darwin. Since Darwin then wishes to forget the whole thing, they are ethically able to grant his request after showing him the culmination of his legacy—the Natural History Museum in London.

== Ideas and themes ==
In the discussion section Cohen and Stewart examine the theory of evolution and the changes in the idea over the years. They also explore how scientific theories happen in general, and how they differ from other ways of thinking, as well as a brief diversion into the concept of time travel. The Discworld story reflects all this, as the wizards must ensure that The Origin of Species is written to maintain Earth's history.

At the 2006 Discworld Convention, Cohen and Stewart explained that they originally drafted a very different outline for Science of Discworld III, in which the wizards visited various different fictional versions of Mars (Ray Bradbury's Mars, H. G. Wells' Mars, Edgar Rice Burroughs' Mars, etc.), culminating in the discovery of a Discworld version of Barsoom, (a square, red world, on the back of four thoats, on the back of a giant zitidar). This was abandoned when it was realised both that this discovery would have to have repercussions in later books, especially if, as planned, the "Martians" invaded; and also that Barsoom was close enough to sword and sorcery in any case that transplanting it to the Discworld setting did not alter it enough to be funny.

== Reception ==
The book was reviewed by Ian C.W Hardy for Trends in Ecology & Evolution. The reviewer wrote that the book, focusing, as the title implies, on the theory of evolution, "is more than a fun story" due to it touching upon a mixture of real world dimensions of science, and that "the value of Darwin’s Watch lies in the way that a diversity of scientific areas are discussed to form an overview of how science does and does not work, and where we are currently 'at'". He concludes by noting that he recommends this volume, as well as its prequels, to his undergraduate students.

Writing for the New Scientist, Stephen Baxter praised the book concluding that "Terry Pratchett has galvanised literacy levels among the young, while Jack Cohen and Ian Stewart qualify as two of our finest popular science writers. Their collaboration is an earnest and conscientious educational project, a fun book which deserves to be taken very seriously indeed".

The book was also positively reviewed for the AudioFile ("Education mixed with entertainment—what a wonderful concept"), Booklist ("For Pratchett fans saddened by the author's passing, the book is a must-read swan song, whereas science buffs who don't mind the fanciful story line will find the nonfiction essay chapters fascinating") and Publishers Weekly ("The late Pratchett, creator of the wildly popular Discworld novels, and his coauthors offer fascinating insight into Darwin, his world, and how Victorian life shaped his theory of evolution. Even technophobic readers will enjoy this cheerful, accessible look at the less-than-linear path of scientific discovery, where the most comfortable answer is usually not the best.")
