= The Science of Discworld =

1999 book by Terry Pratchett, Ian Stewart and Jack Cohen

- Authors: Terry Pratchett, Ian Stewart & Jack Cohen
- Cover artist: Paul Kidby
- Language: English
- Series: Discworld; 1st science novel
- Subject: Human history Evolution Characters Rincewind, Unseen University Staff Locations Unseen University, Roundworld
- Genre: Fantasy
- Published: 1999 (Ebury Press)
- ISBN: 978-0091865153
- Followed by: The Science of Discworld II: The Globe

The Science of Discworld is a 1999 book by novelist Terry Pratchett and popular science writers (and University of Warwick science researchers) Ian Stewart and Jack Cohen. Three sequels, The Science of Discworld II: The Globe, The Science of Discworld III: Darwin's Watch, and The Science of Discworld IV: Judgement Day, have been written by the same authors.

Following publication of the first book in 1999 Terry Pratchett made both Jack Cohen and Professor Ian Stewart "Honorary Wizards of the Unseen University" at the same ceremony at which the University of Warwick gave Terry Pratchett an honorary degree.

The book alternates between a typically absurd Discworld story and serious scientific exposition after each chapter.

The cover of the book, designed by Paul Kidby, is a parody of the 1768 painting "An Experiment on a Bird in the Air Pump" by Joseph Wright of Derby.

== Plot summary ==
The Discworld part of the book begins when a new experimental power source for the Unseen University is commissioned in the university's squash court. The new "reactor" is capable of splitting the thaum (the basic particle of magic), in homage to the Chicago Pile-1 nuclear reactor, which was housed in a rackets court at the University of Chicago.

However, the wizards' new reactor produces vastly more magical energy than planned and threatens to explode, destroying the University, the Discworld, and the entire universe. The university's thinking engine, Hex, decides to divert all the magic into creating a space containing nothing—no matter, no energy, no reality, and, importantly, no magic. The Dean sticks his fingers in the space and "twiddles" them, inadvertently creating the universe. The wizards soon discover that they can move things around in the universe, using Hex. They call it the Roundworld (the Earth), because in it, matter seems to accrete into balls in space (instead of discs on the backs of turtles). They decide to appoint Rincewind, whom they dragged out of bed in the early hours of the morning, the Egregious Professor of Cruel and Unusual Geography, and send him down (against his will) to investigate this strange world.

The wizards create a series of balls of matter in space, and give one of them a Moon (accidentally). This stabilizes the ball enough that, over a score of millennia (the wizards can skip over vast periods of Roundworld time, allowing them to view the history of the universe in less than a month), blobs of life emerge, ready to begin evolving into more complex forms. The book also features a fictional crab civilization and the dinosaurs (both of which are wiped out by comets/asteroids colliding with the earth), before jumping ahead to when an advanced civilization (presumably humans) has evacuated the earth due to an impending natural disaster.

== Ideas and themes ==
The science centres on the origins of the universe, earth and the beginnings of life, the fiction on the creation of a world (the Earth) in a jar. One of the themes is that most scientific explanations are in reality a good deal more complicated than most of us realize. It is explained that this is because their teachers use Lies-To-Children or, in Ponder Stibbons' case, Lies-To-Wizards.

The even-numbered chapters are self-contained essays that discuss, among others, the following topics:

- Squash Court Science: Nuclear energy.
- Science and Magic: What is science and how it works.
- Beginnings and Becomings: The origin and nature of the Universe.
- We are Stardust: Atoms. The periodic table.
- The Shape of Things: The shape of the Universe; the Theory of Relativity.
- Where do Rules Come From?: Is a "Theory of Everything" possible?; Quantum Mechanics.
- Disc Worlds. The Solar System.
- Earth and Fire. Geology: the structure of planet Earth.
- Air and Water. The atmosphere, the oceans, the surface of the planet.
- A Giant Leap for Moonkind: the moon.
- Things that aren't: things that are defined by being opposites, normally with only one of them being measurable and not both (light, heat, etc.).
- Despite which...: The origin of life.
- Unnatural Selection: Evolution.
- The Descent of Darwin: Evolution.
- The Iceberg Cometh: Ice Ages.
- Universals and Parochials: Evolution.
- Don't Look Up: Meteors and other things that might cause another global extinction.
- Nine Times out of Ten: Statistics and biases.
- Running from Dinosaurs: dinosaurs.
- The Death of Dinosaurs.
- Mammals on the Make: the expansion of mammals.
- Anthill Inside: The origin of hominids.
- Extel Outside: Culture.
- Ways to Leave your Planet: space travel.
- Eden and Camelot. Conclusion.

The concept of narrativium, introduced in the book (a fictional element responsible for the creation of narrative, a parody of phlogiston), has been used by Pratchett and his co-authors to explore the role of narratives in real-world literature and science.

== Reception ==
Publishers Weekly, reviewing the 2014 edition, described it as "unique and outrageously funny", with "writing [that] is as entertaining as it is accessible." The New England Science Fiction Association considered it "a fine popularization of science and of the scientific method", and "most unusual and entertaining", but observed that this makes it "something of an oddity".

The book and its sequel, The Science of Discworld II: The Globe, have been reviewed by Ian C.W Hardy for Trends in Ecology & Evolution. Writing about the first book, he noted that it "deals with the ontogeny of our universe and recapitulates phylogeny", or, in simpler words, the authors "give us their take on chimpanzees and human origins, brains, pattern recognition, self-awareness, self-referentiality, cultural evolution and space exploration". He concluded that the books are a "fun" and "engaging" example of popular science writing.

== Origins ==
Cohen reports that it was extremely difficult to find a publisher who was willing to purchase the book, saying "I spent two-and-a-half years going around editors. I must have had 80 [meetings with editors]. And they all said 'don't be stupid'. At last Ebury took it. The editor there was made to understand that if it sold less than 10,000 copies, he'd lose his job. (...) It sold more than 200,000 copies in the first year." He also states that the books were inspired by a "bloody awful" book on the science of Star Trek, and noted that Pratchett was initially reluctant to write about science on the Discworld "because there isn't any science on the Discworld".

Stewart discussed his views on the book series in his paper "Mathematics, the media, and the public".

== See also ==
- Lie-to-children, a method of teaching complex subjects
