= Why Beauty Is Truth =

2007 book by Ian Stewart

Why Beauty Is Truth: A History of Symmetry
- Hardcover edition
- Author: Ian Stewart
- Language: English
- Subject: Mathematics
- Genre: Non-fiction
- Publisher: Basic Books
- Publication date: April 10, 2007
- Publication place: United States
- Media type: Print, e-book
- Pages: 304 pp.
- ISBN: 978-0465082360
- OCLC: 76481488
- Dewey Decimal: 539.7/25 22
- LC Class: Q172.5.S95 S744 2007

Why Beauty Is Truth: A History of Symmetry is a 2007 book by Ian Stewart.

== Overview ==
Following the life and work of famous mathematicians from antiquity to the present, Stewart traces mathematics' developing handling of the concept of symmetry. One of the first takeaways, established in the preface of this book, is that it dispels the idea of the origins of symmetry in geometry, as is often the first context in which the term is introduced. This book, through its chapters, establishes its origins in algebra, more specifically group theory.

== Contents ==
The topics covered are:

- Chapter 1: The Scribes of Babylon

The earliest records of solving quadratic equations.

- Chapter 2: The Household Name

Euclid's influence on geometry in general and on regular polygons in particular.

- Chapter 3: The Persian Poet

Omar Khayyám's solution to the cubic equation, which makes use of conic sections.

- Chapter 4: The Gambling Scholar

Niccolò Fontana Tartaglia found the first algebraic solutions to special cubic equations.
Gerolamo Cardano used algebra to solve the cubic and quartic equation.

- Chapter 5: The Cunning Fox

Carl Friedrich Gauss proved that the regular 17-gon can be constructed using only compass and straightedge, and extended the field of real numbers to the complex numbers.

- Chapter 6: The Frustrated Doctor and the Sickly Genius

Joseph Louis Lagrange understood that all approaches to solve algebraic equations could be understood as symmetry transformations of such equations.
Alexandre-Théophile Vandermonde used symmetric functions as an ansatz to solve general algebraic equations, which would lead to the development of Galois theory.
Paolo Ruffini developed a first (incomplete) proof that the quintic equation cannot be solved analytically.
Niels Abel formalized group theory, the indispensable tool in describing symmetries.

- Chapter 7: The Luckless Revolutionary

Évariste Galois laid the foundations to what is today known as Galois theory.

- Chapter 8: The Mediocre Engineer and the Transcendent Professor

Pierre Laurent Wantzel proved that it is impossible to double the cube, trisect the angle, and constructing a regular polygon using only compass and straightedge.
Ferdinand von Lindemann proved the transcendence of pi, and by implication that it is impossible to square the circle using only compass and straightedge.

- Chapter 9: The Drunken Vandal

William Rowan Hamilton extended the field of complex numbers to the quaternions.

- Chapter 10: The Would-Be Soldier and the Weakly Bookworm

Marius Sophus Lie formalized Lie groups and Lie algebras.
Wilhelm Killing classified all simple Lie algebras (in what Ian Stewart calls the "greatest mathematical paper of all time")

- Chapter 11: The Clerk from the Patent Office

Albert Einstein developed in his theory of general relativity a symmetry of space and time.

- Chapter 12: A Quantum Quintet

Max Planck, Erwin Schrödinger, Werner Heisenberg, Paul Dirac, Eugene Wigner were major contributors to the early development of Quantum Mechanics. Wigner introduced symmetries into quantum physics.

- Chapter 13: The Five-Dimensional Man

An overview of attempts to unify the fundamental forces, and the role of symmetry in that endeavor.

- Chapter 14: The Political Journalist

Edward Witten and Superstring theory

- Chapter 15: A Muddle of Mathematicians

Here, connections between field extensions of real numbers (complex numbers, quaternions, octonions), the exceptional simple Lie algebras detected by Killing (G_{2}, F_{4}, E_{6}, E_{7}, and E_{8}), and symmetries occurring in string theory are explored.

- Chapter 16: Seekers after Truth and Beauty

Closes the book by contemplating the role of mathematics in physical research.

== Review ==
What makes the book a compulsive read is that Stewart combines the advances in mathematics with the stories of their discoverers, who could be described by the author's preferred collective expression as "a muddle of mathematicians". These compulsive characters are almost archetypal: the romantic, doomed Frenchman dying in a duel over a woman (Evariste Galois); a brilliant yet impoverished academic (Niels Henrik Abel); and, my favourite, a drunken Irishman who "set out to invent an algebra of three dimensions but realised, in a flash of intuition that caused him to vandalise a bridge, that he would have to settle for four dimensions instead" (William Rowan Hamilton). Driven by the compulsion to solve mathematical riddles, they are united by similar qualities: perseverance, obsession, and the kind of genius that seems inevitably to lead to tragedy on an epic scale. Their experiences add a very human dimension to the story.

—Plus Magazine
