= The Mathematics of Life =

Popular science book by mathematician Ian Stewart

- First edition cover
- Author: Ian Stewart
- Language: English
- Subject: Biology, biomathematics
- Genre: Non-fiction
- Published: 2011
- Publisher: Basic Books
- Publication place: United States
- Media type: Print, e-book
- Pages: 368 pp.
- ISBN: 978-0465022380
- OCLC: 670481599

The Mathematics of Life is a 2011 popular science book by mathematician Ian Stewart, on the increasing role of mathematics in biology.

== Overview ==
Stewart discusses the mathematics behind such topics as population growth, speciation, brain function, chaos theory, game theory, networking, symmetry, and animal coloration, with little recourse to equations. He identifies six revolutions which modernized biology:

1. The invention of the microscope
2. A systematic means of classifying species
3. Evidence of evolution
4. The expansion of the field of genetics
5. The discovery of the structure of DNA
6. The application of new mathematics to biology

== Reception ==
Writer Alex Bellos described The Mathematics of Life as "a testament to the versatility of maths and how it is shaping our understanding of the world." Kirkus Reviews called the book "an ingenious overview of biology with emphasis on mathematical ideas—stimulating but requiring careful reading despite the lack of equations." A review in Notices of the American Mathematical Society noted that the book "does an admirable job of unfolding the mathematics undergirding so much of the research being carried out today in the many fields that comprise the subject of biology."

Mathematician and science writer Keith Devlin criticized the book, writing that "readers of the author's many general-audience books on mathematics may be surprised to find themselves at times frustrated by his latest outing, which is marred by overlapping and often repetitious passages."
