= Brian Hartley (mathematician) =

British mathematician (1939–1994)

- Born: 15 May 1939
- Died: 8 October 1994 (aged 55)
- Education: University of Cambridge
- Scientific career
- Workplaces: University of Manchester; University of Chicago; MIT; University of Warwick
- Doctoral advisor: Philip Hall
- Doctoral students: Ian Stewart

Brian Hartley (15 May 1939 – 8 October 1994) was a British mathematician specialising in group theory.

== Education ==
Hartley's PhD thesis was completed in 1964 at the University of Cambridge under Philip Hall's supervision.

== Career and research ==
Hartley spent a year at the University of Chicago, and another at MIT before being appointed as a lecturer at the newly established University of Warwick in 1966, and was promoted to reader in 1973. He moved to a chair at the School of Mathematics at the University of Manchester in 1977 where he served as head of the Mathematics department between 1982 and 1984.

He published more than 100 papers, mostly on group theory, and collaborated widely with other mathematicians. His main interest was locally finite groups where he used his wide knowledge of finite groups to prove properties of infinite groups which shared some of the features of finite groups. One recurrent theme appearing in his work was the relationship between the structure of groups and their subgroups consisting of elements fixed by particular automorphisms.

Hartley is perhaps best known by undergraduates for his book Rings, Modules and Linear Algebra, with Trevor Hawkes.

== Personal life ==
Hartley was a keen hill walker, and it was while descending Helvellyn in the English Lake District that he collapsed with a heart attack and died.
