= The Jewel of Medina =

Historical novel

- Cover for the planned Ballantine release of The Jewel of Medina
- Author: Sherry Jones
- Language: English
- Published: October 2008; Gibson Square (UK); Beaufort Books (US)
- Publication place: United States
- Media type: Print (hardcover)
- Pages: 432 pages
- ISBN: 978-0-345-50316-9; 978-0825305184; 0825305187
- OCLC: 191922573

The Jewel of Medina is a historical novel by Sherry Jones that recounts the life of Aisha, one of Muhammad's wives, from the age of six, when she was betrothed to Muhammad, to her death.

Although the novel was originally scheduled for release in 2008 by Random House, it was cancelled due to concerns about possible inflammatory content. Domestic and international publication rights were subsequently picked up by other publishing houses, and the book was released October 2008.

== Cancellation ==
Random House signed Sherry Jones to a two-book contract in 2007, offering her an advance of one hundred thousand dollars, with The Jewel of Medina scheduled to be released on August 12, 2008. The novel was to be featured by the Book of the Month Club and the Quality Paperback Book Club.

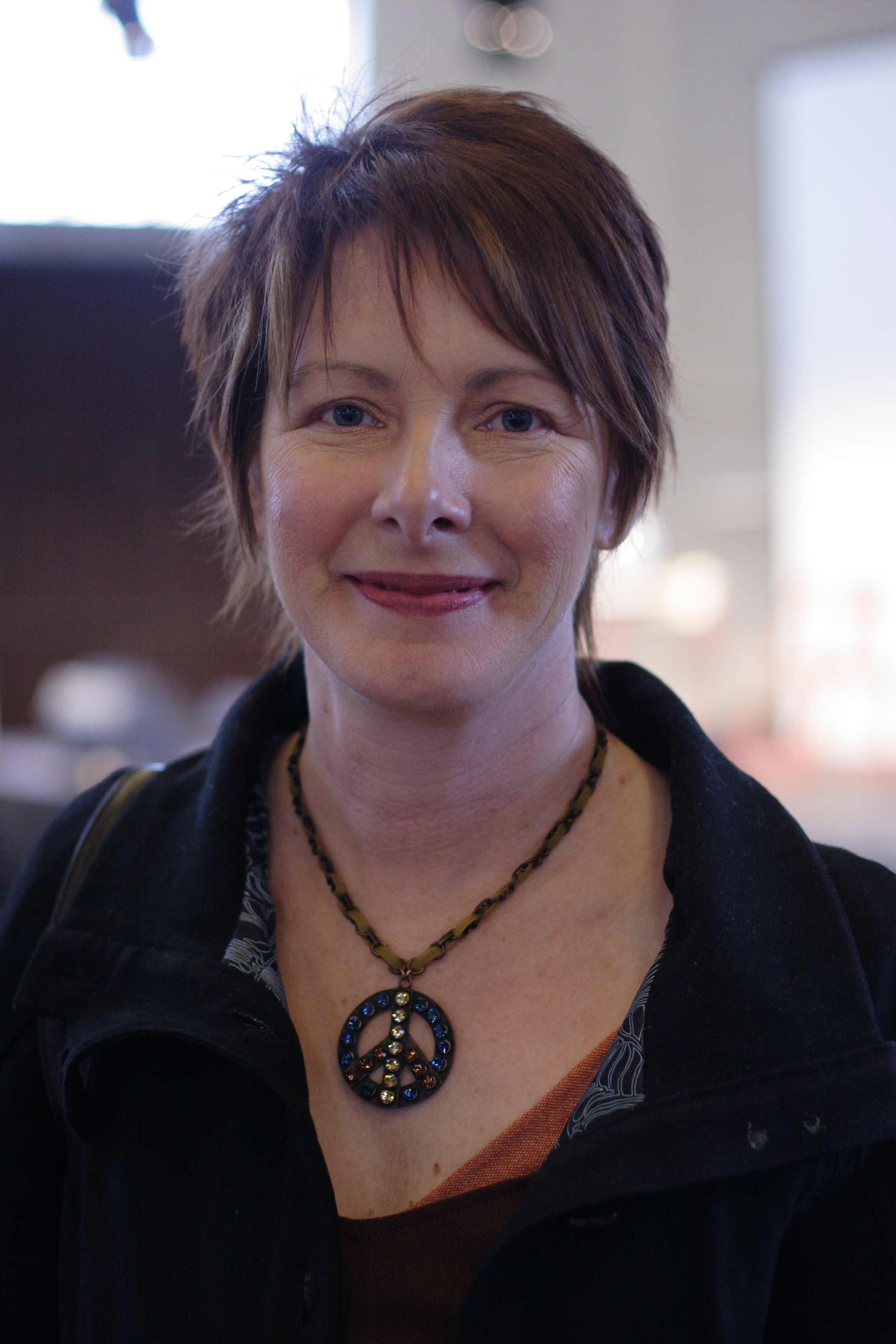
Sherry Jones in Århus, Denmark, 15 March 2009

Prior to publication, the Random House publicity department solicited comment from Denise Spellberg, professor of history and Middle Eastern studies at the University of Texas. She reportedly described the book as "incredibly offensive" and a "very ugly, stupid piece of work," suggesting that its "explosive" content could inspire violence among radical Islamic groups and thereby represent a threat to national security. Random House responded by canceling the publication run.

== Controversy ==
The Washington Post, Pittsburgh Post-Gazette, and Las Vegas Review-Journal printed editorials critical of the cancellation. Irshad Manji wrote in The Globe and Mail that preemptive censorship was offensive to Muslims. Adam Kirsch criticized Spellberg and Random House for depriving Muslims of the freedom to reimagine their religious tradition through the eyes of a novelist. Carlin Romano argued that Spellberg's "aggressive act" was tantamount to advocacy of censorship. Spellberg said that she did "not espouse censorship of any kind" and that she had "used [her] scholarly expertise to assess the novel...."

Salman Rushdie derided the decision as "censorship by fear." Andrew Franklin of Profile Books labeled it "absolutely shocking" and branded Random House editors as "cowards." Bill Poser decried what he perceived to be suppression of speech deemed potentially offensive "out of fear of violence by religious fanatics." Geoffrey Robertson argued that the publisher should pay Jones "substantial compensation" and recommended that the book be placed on a website "so everyone can read it."

Stanley Fish disagreed with the characterisation of censorship, arguing that as a nongovernmental entity, Random House had simply made "a minor business decision" and that no free-speech concerns were implicated. For her part, Jones insisted that she had approached her topic "respectfully," envisioning the novel as "a bridge builder."

== Publication ==
The cover of the Serbian edition, the first official edition of the book.

The Jewel of Medina was published in Serbia in August 2008. After strong reactions from the Serbian Muslim community, Serbian publisher Beobook withdrew it from stores but returned it to shelves shortly thereafter to forestall widespread piracy. It remained the number-one bestseller in that nation for at least two months.

On September 4, 2008, British publishing house Gibson Square announced that it would publish The Jewel of Medina in the United Kingdom and the Commonwealth, with founder Martin Rynja calling for "open access to literary works, regardless of fear." Writer Alvaro Vargas Llosa praised the firm's "willing[ness] to run the risk of not letting the threat of violence inhibit free expression."

The following day, Beaufort Books announced plans to publish the novel in America, signing Jones to a contract with a smaller advance but higher royalties.

On September 27, 2008, Rynja's London home was firebombed. Three men were arrested on suspicion of commissioning, preparing or instigating acts of terrorism and ultimately convicted of conspiracy to recklessly damage property and endanger life. Radical Islamic cleric Anjem Choudhary warned of further attacks. Gibson Square postponed publication of the novel indefinitely.

As of 2009, the book had been published in Germany, Denmark, Serbia, Italy, Spain, India, Hungary, Brazil, Russia, North Macedonia, Finland, Poland, Sweden, and the Netherlands. It has been translated into 20 languages.

== Reviews ==
Marwa Elnaggar criticized the book's portrayal of pre-Islamic Arabic culture, suggesting that Jones was influenced by "the idea of the exotic and mystical Orient." Ethar El-Katatney critiqued the book as "flawed."

Farzana Versey dismissed the writing as "chick lit . . . rather treacly." The New York Times Book Review scathingly described Jones as "an inexperienced, untalented author" of "lamentable" prose.

Anjem Choudary and Omar Bakri Muhammad condemned the novel as "blasphemous" and Jones as "an enemy of Islam," denouncing the story as "yet another chapter in the continuing war against Islam and Muslims." Jones retorted that she was offering "the hand of peace with a book that is respectful" and urged Muslims to read the book and judge it for themselves.

== Sequel ==
A sequel entitled A'isha: The Legacy of the Prophet internationally and The Sword of Medina domestically was published in October 2009.

== See also ==
- The Cartoons that Shook the World, a similar case of pre-publication censorship
- Religious censorship
