= Muhammad: The "Banned" Images =

Book by Gary Hull

- Author: Gary Hull
- Language: English
- Publisher: Voltaire Press
- Publication date: 2009
- Publication place: United States
- ISBN: 978-0-615-32421-0

Muhammad: The "Banned" Images is a 2009 book published in response to the expunging of all images of Muhammad from The Cartoons that Shook the World, a 2009 book about the Jyllands-Posten Muhammad cartoons controversy by Jytte Klausen published by Yale University Press. In August 2009, John Donatich, director of Yale University Press, announced that it would exclude all images of Muhammad from Klausen's book, citing an anonymous panel of experts who claimed that publication of the illustrations "ran a serious risk of instigating violence."

The book was published in November, 2009 by Voltaire Press, a publishing company founded by Duke University Professor Gary Hull for the purpose. Muhammad: The "Banned" Images reproduces 31 images, including all those mentioned in the New York Times article as having been expunged by Yale. According to Hull, the new publication is "a 'picture book' – or errata to the bowdlerized version of Klausen's book."

Michael Schoenfeld, vice president for public affairs and government relations, said Duke University supports the academic freedom of its professors, but that the book is not connected to Duke. "Our faculty have both the right and responsibility to speak out and debate critical issues as individuals and scholars."

The book includes a Statement of Principle with prominent signatories, which states in part:

The failure to stand up for free expression emboldens those who would attack and undermine it. It is time for colleges and universities in particular to exercise moral and intellectual leadership. It is incumbent on those responsible for the education of the next generation of leaders to stand up for certain basic principles: that the free exchange of ideas is essential to liberal democracy; that each person is entitled to hold and express his or her own views without fear of bodily harm; and that the suppression of ideas is a form of repression used by authoritarian regimes around the world to control and dehumanize their citizens and squelch opposition.
