= Letters to a Young Mathematician =

Book by Ian Stewart

- Author: Ian Stewart (mathematician)
- Language: English
- Series: Art of Mentoring
- Publisher: Basic Books
- Publication date: 2006
- Publication place: United States
- Pages: 210 (first edition, paperback)
- ISBN: 0-465-08231-9 (first edition, paperback)
- OCLC: 963569756

Letters to a Young Mathematician (ISBN 0-465-08231-9) is a 2006 book by Ian Stewart, and is part of Basic Books' Art of Mentoring series. Stewart mentions in the preface that he considers this book an update to G.H. Hardy's A Mathematician's Apology.

The book is made up of letters to a fictional correspondent of Stewart's, an aspiring mathematician named Meg. The roughly chronological letters follow Meg from her high school years up to her receiving tenure from an American university.

Reviews of the book were generally positive. Fernando Q. Gouvêa's review for the MAA calls it "full of good advice, much of it direct and to the point" and later, that "while it won't change the world, it may well help some young people decide to be (or not to be) mathematicians." In Emma Carberry's review for the AMS, reacted differently, saying that "one does not so much feel the benefit of a ream of practical advice, but rather of exposure to the inner realm of mathematics". A review in Nature was harsher, however, saying that "there is a general lack of information ... [and] too much jargon" and that it "suffers from being written entirely for a US audience", but even this review finds a bright note, "The letter in which Stewart tells Meg how to teach undergraduates should be compulsory reading for all lecturers and tutors."
