= Denise Spellberg =

American scholar of Islamic history (born c. 1958)

Denise A. Spellberg
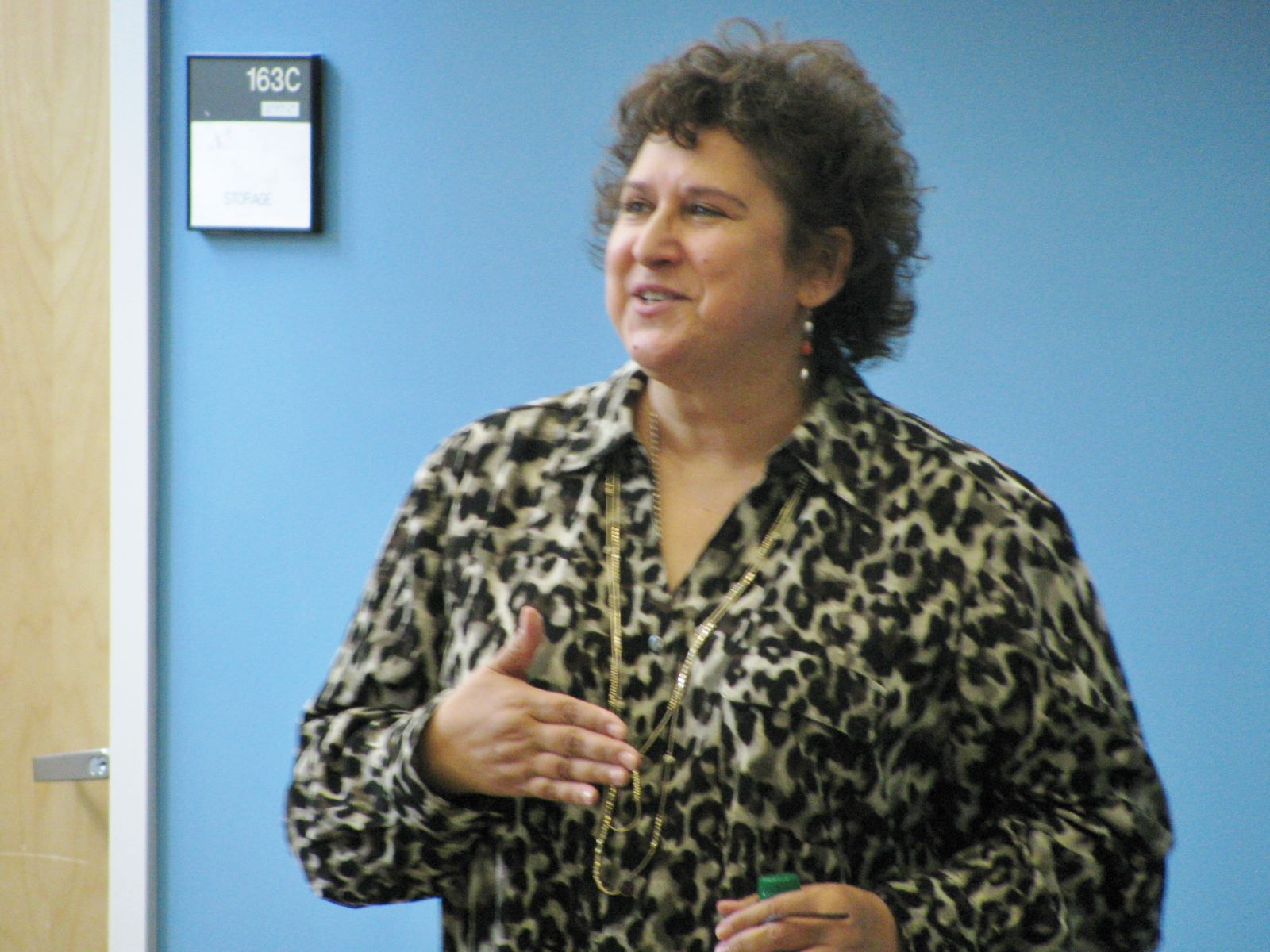
- Born: September 1957 (age 69)
- Education: Smith College; Columbia University
- Occupations: Educator, academic

Denise A. Spellberg (September 1957) is an American scholar of Islamic history. She is professor of history and Middle Eastern Studies at the University of Texas at Austin.

== Early life and education ==
Spellberg holds an A.B. in History from Smith College (1980) and an M.A., M.Phil., and a PhD (1989) in Middle Eastern History from Columbia University.

== Academic work ==
Spellberg is the author of Politics, Gender, and the Islamic Past: The Legacy of 'A'isha Bint Abi Bakr, a widely cited work on the portrayal of Aisha in Islamic tradition. In particular, Spellberg shows how later commentators reinterpreted Aisha's role at the Battle of the Camel (656) where she rode her camel into battle against Ali but stayed inside the howdah on its back with the curtains closed, as an argument that women should never participate in public affairs.

== The Jewel of Medina ==
In 2008 Spellberg was involved in a controversy over Sherry Jones's (author) historical novel The Jewel of Medina. Random House, which intended to publish the novel later that year, had sent Spellberg galley proofs, hoping for a publishable comment. Spellberg sharply criticized the novel from a historical perspective, and also reportedly told Random House publishing the book might result in violence by radical Muslims. Subsequently, Random House indefinitely postponed publication, citing concerns about violence from extremists.

Asra Nomani wrote about the events in an opinion piece for The Wall Street Journal, in which she characterized Spellberg as "the instigator of the trouble". In the wake of Nomani's article, a number of publications printed pieces criticizing Spellberg's actions as tantamount to advocating censorship.

Spellberg responded in the Wall Street Journal, contesting Nomani's characterization of her as the "instigator" of the book's cancellation. She wrote that she was not advocating censorship, but rather offering her professional assessment of the book and a warning about the potential reaction from some Muslims, stating "I felt it was my professional responsibility to counter this novel's fallacious representation of a very real woman's life."

== Thomas Jefferson's Qur'an: Islam and the Founders ==
In 2013, Spellberg published Thomas Jefferson's Qur'an: Islam and the Founders. The book discusses a copy of the Qur'an owned by Thomas Jefferson as well as Jefferson's views on Islam, arguing that his vision for religious freedom in the United States specifically included Muslims.

== Books ==
- Politics, Gender, and the Islamic Past: the Legacy of A'isha bint Abi Bakr. New York: Columbia University Press. 1994. ISBN 978-0231079990.
- Thomas Jefferson's Qur'an: Islam and the Founders. New York: Knopf. 2013. ISBN 978-0307268228
