= Significant Figures (book) =

2017 book by Ian Stewart

Significant Figures The Lives and Work of Great Mathematicians
- Front cover
- Author: Ian Stewart
- Language: English
- Genre: Non-fiction
- Publisher: Basic Books
- Publication date: September 12, 2017
- Publication place: United States
- Media type: Hardcover
- Pages: 303
- ISBN: 0465096123

Significant Figures: The Lives and Work of Great Mathematicians is a 2017 nonfiction book by British mathematician Ian Stewart FRS CMath FIMA, published by Basic Books. In the work, Stewart discusses the lives and contributions of 25 figures who are prominent in the history of mathematics. The 25 mathematicians selected are: Archimedes, Liu Hui, Muḥammad ibn Mūsā al-Khwārizmī, Madhava of Sangamagrama, Gerolamo Cardano, Pierre de Fermat, Isaac Newton, Euler, Fourier, Gauss, Lobachevsky, Galois, Ada Lovelace, Boole, Riemann, Cantor, Sofia Kovalevskaia, Poincaré, Hilbert, Emmy Noether, Ramanujan, Gödel, Turing, Mandelbrot, and Thurston.

== Reception ==
In Kirkus Reviews, it was written that "even a popularizer as skilled and prolific as Stewart cannot expect general readers to fully digest his highly distilled explanations of what these significant figures did to resolve ever more complex conundrums as math advanced." However, the reviewer praised Stewart's sketches of the lives and times of the innovators. The book was described as "a text for teachers, precocious students, and intellectually curious readers unafraid to tread unfamiliar territory".

== See also ==
- In Pursuit of the Unknown: 17 Equations That Changed the World
