= Does God Play Dice? =

1989 book by Ian Stewart

Does God Play Dice: The New Mathematics of Chaos
- Second edition cover
- Author: Ian Stewart
- Language: English
- Subject: Chaos theory
- Genre: Non-fiction
- Publisher: Blackwell Publishing
- Publication date: 1989
- Publication place: United Kingdom
- Media type: Print (Paperback)
- Pages: 393 pp.
- ISBN: 978-0-631-23251-3
- OCLC: 48533172
- Dewey Decimal: 003/.857 22
- LC Class: Q172.5.C45 S74 2002

Does God Play Dice: The New Mathematics of Chaos is a non-fiction book about chaos theory written by British mathematician Ian Stewart. The book was initially published by Blackwell Publishing in 1989.

== Summary ==
In this book, Stewart explains chaos theory to an audience presumably unfamiliar with it. As the book progresses the writing changes from simple explanations of chaos theory to in-depth, rigorous mathematical study. Stewart covers mathematical concepts such as differential equations, resonance, nonlinear dynamics, and probability. The book is illustrated with diagrams and graphs of mathematical concepts and equations when applicable.

The back of the book, and a summary of its content, reads, "The science of chaos is forcing scientists to rethink Einstein's fundamental assumptions regarding the way the universe behaves. Chaos theory has already shown that simple systems, obeying precise laws, can nevertheless act in a random manner. Perhaps God plays dice within a cosmic game of complete law and order. Does God Play Dice? reveals a strange universe in which nothing may be as it seems. Familiar geometric shapes such as circles and ellipses give way to infinitely complex structures known as fractals, the fluttering of a butterfly's wings can change the weather, and the gravitational attraction of a creature in a distant galaxy can change the fate of the solar system."

The title of the book is a reference to a famous quote by Albert Einstein.

== Book ==
- Ian Stewart: Does God Play Dice: The New Mathematics of Chaos, Blackwell Publishing, 1989, ISBN 978-0-631-23251-3
