= Aisha =

Muhammad's third wife (c. 614 – 678)

Aisha Mother of the Believers
- عائشة
- Born: c. 614; Mecca, Hejaz, Arabia
- Died: c. July 678 (aged 63–65); Medina, Umayyad Caliphate
- Resting place: Al-Baqi Cemetery, Medina
- Spouse: Muhammad (m. 620; died 632)
- Parent(s): Abu Bakr (father); Umm Ruman (mother)
- Family: Banu Taym; Ahl al-Bayt (by marriage); (Note: disputed by Shia muslims)

Aisha bint Abi Bakr (Note: /ˈɑːiːʃɑː/ AH-ee-shah, US also /-ʃə, aɪˈiːʃə/ -shə, eye-EE-shə; Arabic: عائشة بنت أبي بكر, romanized: ʿĀʾisha bint Abī Bakr, pronounced [ˈʕaːʔiʃa]. Like other wives of Muhammad, her name is sometimes prefixed by the honorific "Mother of the Believers" (Arabic: أمّ المؤمنين, romanized: ʾUmm al-Muʾminīn).) (c. 614 CE – July 678) was the third and youngest wife of Islamic prophet Muhammad. After Muhammad's death, she was politically active during the Rashidun Caliphate and stands out as a prominent female figure of the period.

A muhadditha and political figure, Aisha played a significant role in early Islamic history, both during Muhammad's life and after his death. She is regarded in Sunni tradition as intelligent, inquisitive, and scholarly, and is often described as Muhammad's most beloved wife after Khadija bint Khuwaylid. She contributed to the transmission of Muhammad's teachings and remained active in the Muslim community for 44 years after his death. Aisha is credited with narrating over 2,000 hadiths, covering not only aspects of Muhammad's personal life but also legal, ritual, and theological subjects such as inheritance, pilgrimage, prayer, and eschatology. Her intellectual abilities and knowledge of poetry, medicine, and Islamic jurisprudence were praised by early scholars, including al-Zuhri and her student Urwa ibn al-Zubayr.

In addition to her scholarly contributions, Aisha was involved in the religious, social, and political affairs of the early Muslim community. During the caliphates of Abu Bakr (her father), Umar, Uthman, and Ali, she engaged in public discourse, transmitted religious knowledge, and took part in major events, including the Battle of the Camel. Her participation in such matters was notable given the limited public roles generally held by women at the time. In Sunni Islam, she is revered as a leading scholar, hadith transmitter, and teacher of several companions and the tabi'in, while in Shia Islam, she is viewed critically for her opposition to Ali.

Aisha's reported age at marriage has become a subject of modern debate and criticism. Most early Islamic sources state that she was nine years old when the marriage was consummated. This has led to criticism of Muhammad based on contemporary views and laws on the age of consent. In Islamic literature, the young age of her marriage did not draw any significant discourse; nonetheless, scholars Denise Spellberg and Kecia Ali find the very mention of her age to be atypical of early Muslim biographers, and hypothesize a connotation to her virginity and, more than that, religious purity. (Note: Ibn Sa'd notes Aisha to have boasted of her being the only virgin-wife before Muhammad himself.)

== Early life ==
Aisha was born in Mecca c. 614. She was the daughter of Abu Bakr and Umm Ruman, two of Muhammad's companions. No sources offer much more information about Aisha's childhood years.

== Relationship with Muhammad ==
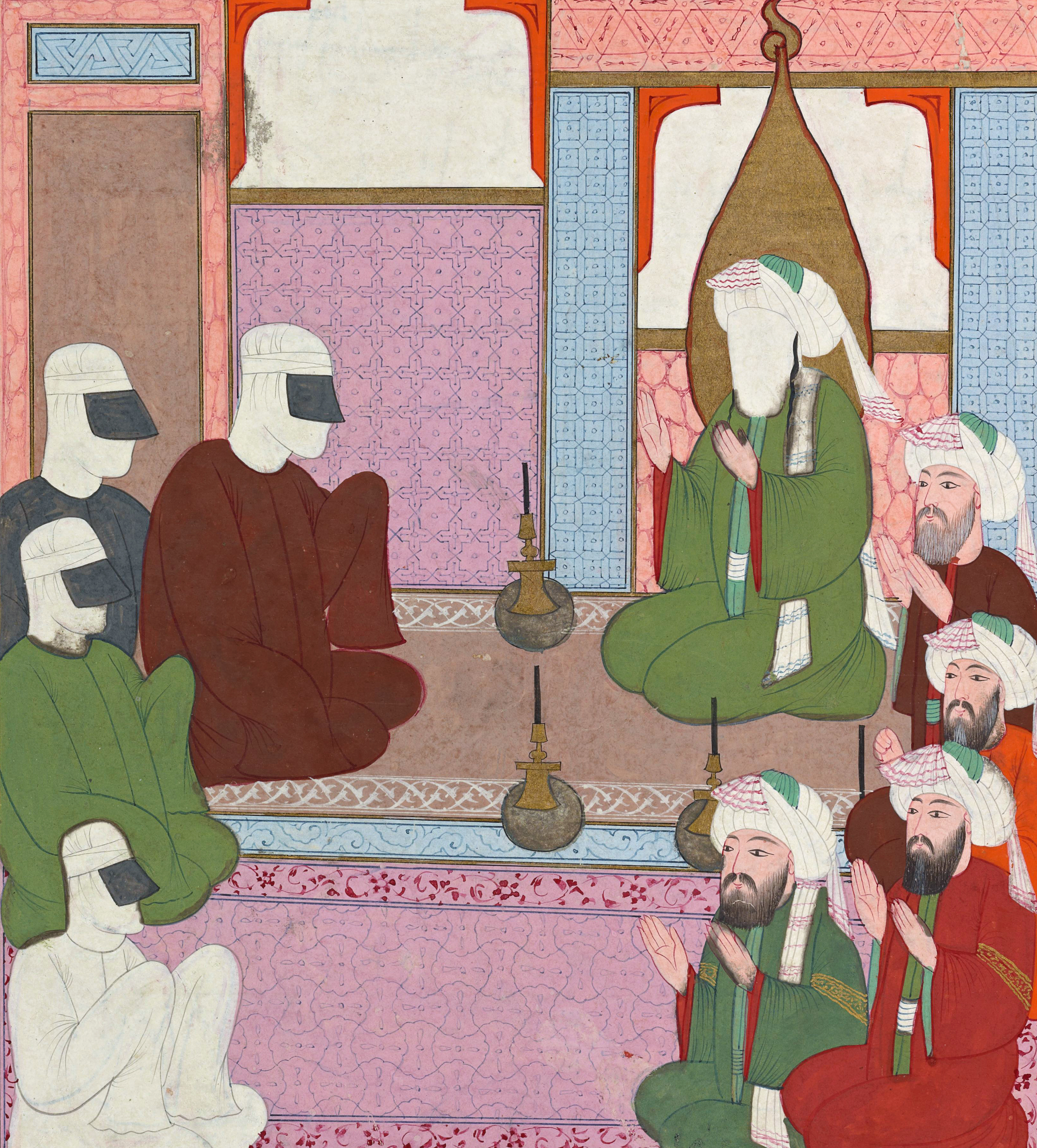
Ottoman miniature from a Siyar-i Nabî manuscript depicting Aisha (left, in brown) informing her husband, Muhammad, about a local plague.

In most Muslim traditions, Khadija bint Khuwaylid is described as Muhammad's most beloved and favored wife; Sunni tradition places Aisha as second only to Khadija. There are several hadiths, or stories or sayings of Muhammad, that support this belief. One relates that when a companion asked Muhammad, "who is the person you love most in the world?" he responded, "Aisha." Others relate that Muhammad built Aisha's apartment so that her door opened directly into the mosque, and that she was the only woman with whom Muhammad received revelations. They bathed in the same water, and he prayed while she lay stretched out in front of him.

Various traditions reveal the mutual affection between Muhammad and Aisha. He would often just sit and watch her and her friends play with dolls, and on occasion, he would even join them. Leila Ahmed argues, "Aisha must have felt reasonably equal to and unawed by this prophet of God, for his announcement of a revelation permitting him to enter into marriages disallowed other men drew from her the retort, 'It seems to me your Lord hastens to satisfy your desire!'" Furthermore, Muhammad and Aisha had a strong intellectual relationship.

=== Marriage to Muhammad ===
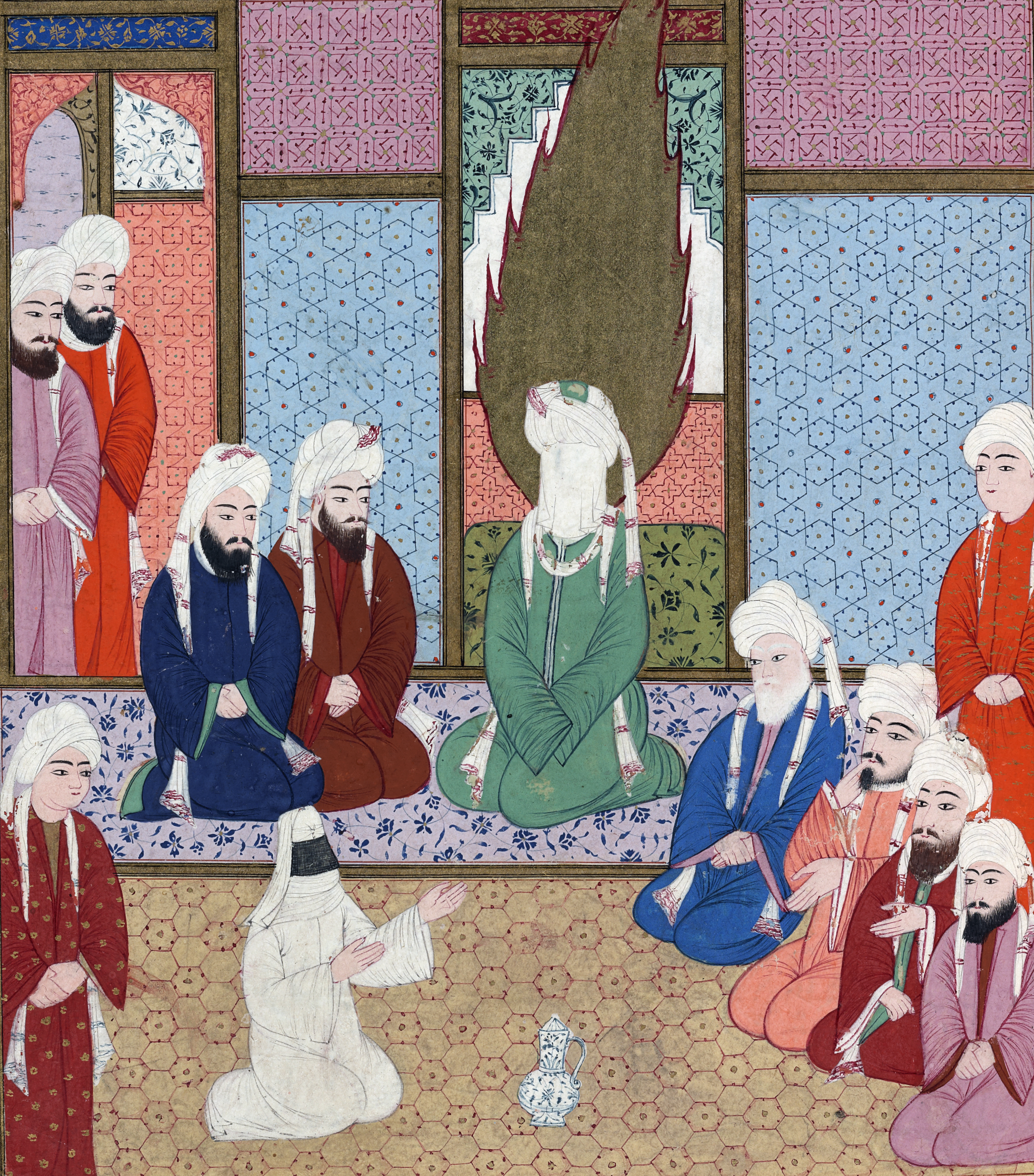
Ottoman miniature depicting Khawlah bint Hakim proposing the marriage between Muhammad and Aisha, from a 16th-century Siyer-i Nebi manuscript, produced in Constantinople and now held in the Topkapı Palace Museum, Istanbul

Muhammad reportedly stated that he saw Aisha twice in his dreams, being carried in a silk cloth by an angel who told him she would be his wife. He believed that if the dreams were from God, they would come true. Following the death of his first wife, Khadija bint Khuwaylid, his aunt Khawlah bint Hakim suggested that he marry Aisha. Aisha's father Abu Bakr was at first unsure about marrying his daughter to Muhammad; he thought they were brothers. Muhammad clarified that they were merely brothers in religion, and it was legal for him to marry Aisha. Aisha's engagement to Jubayr ibn Mut'im, a boy close to her age, was then annulled. Orientalist W. Montgomery Watt suggests that Muhammad hoped to strengthen his ties with Abu Bakr; the strengthening of ties commonly served as a basis for marriage in Arabian culture.

All extant hadiths agree that Aisha was married to Muhammad in Mecca, but that the marriage was not consummated until the month of Shawwal following his hijrah to Medina, in April 623. Some classical sources, however, state that the marriage itself took place in Medina, without mentioning any delay in consummation.

=== Age at marriage and consummation ===
Classical Islamic sources state that Aisha was six years of age at the time of her marriage with Muhammad (then fifty) and nine at the time of its consummation.

In a hadith recorded in Sahih al-Bukhari, Aisha recalls being married at the age of six. Ibn Sa'd's biography holds her age at the time of marriage as between six and seven, and gives her age at consummation to be nine while Ibn Hisham's biography of Muhammad suggests she may have been ten years old at consummation. Al-Tabari notes Aisha to have stayed with her parents after the marriage and consummated the relationship at nine years of age since she was young and sexually immature at the time of marriage.

One of the few to comment on Aisha's age was Spanish Catholic Juan Andrés, who, in the 16th century, wrote: "You must know that Muhamed contracted marriage with the said Axa, who was Ubequar's Daughter, when she was six years old; and consummated the said Marriage with her, when she was but eight years old; which thing I prove by the said book Azar, upon which I would ask thee, O Moore, and would have thee resolve me, whether it was fit for Muhamed to consummate Marriage with a little girle of eight years old? which is almost a homicide, and a sin against nature, especially in such a man as Muhamed, and who at that time had seven wives together. Speak, O Moore, in Gods Name, was it not a great vice? and was he not a man Luxurious beyond measure?"

In Islamic literature, the young age of her marriage did not draw any significant discourse; nonetheless, Spellberg and Ali find the very mention of her age to be atypical of early Muslim biographers, and hypothesize a connotation to her virginity and, more than that, religious purity. (Note: Ibn Sa'd notes Aisha to have boasted of her being the only virgin-wife before Muhammad himself.) Early Orientalist writers, even in their condescending approach towards Muhammad and Islam, were primarily concerned with Muhammad's embrace of polygamy and the ethics of marrying for political causes; the few who discussed Aisha's age chose to explain the age gap – without any condemnation – by citing the contemporary understanding of the Orient as a hot place, that promulgated sexually deviant practices.

Beginning in the late nineteenth century, with the East and its alleged immoralities subject to increasing opprobrium, (Note: Scholars note the formation of an unprecedented political consciousness in Europe around the time, that created a moral imperative for the Western elites to rescue the victims of Eastern barbarity. Additionally, these reforms were especially palatable to the colonial governments since they fostered the penetration of bureaucracy into hitherto-private affairs and aided in the construction of a governable nation-state.) the colonizing powers sought to abolish child marriage. As such efforts ran into conflicts with local forms of Sharia, Aisha's age at marriage – and the involved Prophetic precedent – became the predominant explanation in explaining the backwardness of Muslim societies and their reticence to reforms. In response, some Muslims (Note: such as Abbas Mahmoud al-Aqqad in Egypt) chose to align themselves with the projects of modernization and re-calculated her age – using deft stratagems of omission and commission – to fix it at early adolescence, but conservatives rejected such revisionist readings since they flew in the face of ʻilm al-ḥadīth.

From the mid-20th century, amid growing concerns of Islamic extremism, as Muslim societies and Islam itself came under renewed scrutiny, pointed criticisms of Aisha's young age at marriage began to be abundant; this has since prompted some (Note: Ali finds an exception in "traditional S. Asian biographers" who maintain outright frankness in noting the "practicalities" of marrying a virgin girl.) Muslim scholars to attempt to contextualize the traditionally accepted age of Aisha with renewed vigor emphasizing on anachronism and the political dimensions of the marriage, often at the expense of historical accuracy. (Note: Ali notes the polarizing environment to have prompted even scholars and popular authors from the West to incorporate apologetics premised on anachronism and political implications, often at the cost of historical accuracy.) Polemicists have used Aisha's age to accuse Muhammad of pedophilia and to explain the high prevalence of child marriage in many Muslim societies.

=== The Necklace Incident ===
When Muhammad and his followers carried out a raid on the Banu Mustaliq tribe, he brought along Aisha, who was 13 years old at the time. She was carried in a closed litter on the back of a camel. Aisha recounted that when the raiding party was resting at night on the way home to Medina from the successful operation, she went out to urinate. After doing so and returning to her litter, she realized that her necklace was missing, so she traced her way back to look for it. By the time she found it, the convoy had already left, thinking she was in the litter. Assuming that they would notice her absence and return to look for her, Aisha decided to stay where she was.

Aisha related that Safwan ibn Muattal, a young Muslim from the raiding party, had lagged behind for some reason. On his solo return journey to Medina, he came across Aisha sleeping on the ground by herself. He addressed her, let her ride on his camel while he guided it, and escorted her home to Medina. It was not until the morning that Muhammad's convoy realized that Aisha was not in her litter. And later, when they were taking a break from the hot midday sun, Aisha and Safwan ran into them. A rumor accusing Aisha of committing adultery with Safwan spread. Moreover, it was said that she had conversed with him several times before. This rumor of adultery, if true, could have led to Aisha being stoned to death.

Upon their arrival in Medina, Aisha fell ill and sensed that Muhammad was uncharacteristically cold toward her. She only learned of the rumor some three weeks later when she was told by Umm Mistah. Aisha subsequently went to her mother, asking what the people were talking about, and she replied, "Daughter, be at peace, for I swear by God that no beautiful woman is married to a man who has other wives, but that these other wives would find fault with her." So Aisha cried all night long.

Muhammad, despite his fondness for Aisha, was unsure of her innocence. He asked Usama ibn Zayd and Ali for their opinions. Usama vouched for Aisha's innocence, but Ali said, "Women abound; you can easily find a substitute. Ask her slave; she might reveal the truth." When the slave girl arrived, Ali hit her and said, "Mind you tell the apostle the truth." But her answer was that she knew only good things about Aisha, with the single exception that when Aisha was entrusted with watching over a dough, she dozed off and allowed a sheep to eat it.

Muhammad later visited Aisha at her parents' house and advised her to confess if she had sinned, as God was merciful towards those who seek repentance. It had been more than a month since Aisha had returned alone with Safwan. Despite Muhammad's advice, Aisha refused to apologize as it would indicate guilt. She told Muhammad that she could find no better parallel for her current situation than that of Joseph's father, who had endured disbelief despite telling the truth and had no other choice but to remain patient. Shortly thereafter, Muhammad experienced a trance and received verses (Quran 24:11–15) that confirmed Aisha's innocence.

=== Death of Muhammad ===
Aisha remained Muhammad's favorite wife throughout his life. When he became ill and suspected that he was probably going to die, he began to ask his wives whose apartment he was to stay in next. They eventually figured out that he was trying to determine when he was due with Aisha, and they then allowed him to retire there. He remained in Aisha's apartment until his death, and his last breath was taken as he lay in Aisha's arms.

== Political career ==
Aisha's role in reviving Arab tradition and advancing female leadership reflects her prominence in early Islam. She was politically active during the caliphates of Abu Bakr, Umar, and Uthman. At a time when women were largely excluded from public affairs, she delivered speeches, took part in political and military events, and helped transmit the teachings of Muhammad to both men and women.

=== Role during caliphate ===
==== Role during first, second, and third caliphates ====
Aisha held a respected position in the early Muslim community as both a wife of Muhammad and the daughter of the first caliph, Abu Bakr. These familial ties contributed to the esteem in which she was held, and she was known by the title al-Ṣiddīqa bint al-Ṣiddīq ("the truthful woman, daughter of the truthful man"), a reference to her character and to her father's early and unwavering support of Muhammad, particularly in accepting the Isra and Mi'raj.

During Umar's caliphate, Aisha is reported to have remained active in public affairs and consulted on political matters. Some historical sources state that she later opposed certain policies of the third caliph, Uthman (r. 644–656), but also demanded accountability for his killers during the caliphate of Ali.

==== First Fitna ====
Domains of Rashidun Caliphate under four caliphs. The divided phase relates to the Rashidun Caliphate of Ali during the First Fitna. Strongholds of the Rashidun Caliphate of Ali during the First Fitna Region under the control of Muawiyah I during the First Fitna Region under the control of Amr ibn al-As during the First Fitna

In 656, Uthman was killed by rebels who had laid siege to his house, triggering the First Fitna. Following his death, Ali was offered the caliphate, which he accepted amid political pressure, though many reports state he was not involved in Uthman's assassination. Aisha reportedly later criticized Ali for not immediately punishing those responsible. She, along with Talha ibn Ubayd Allah and al-Zubayr ibn al-Awwam, mobilized forces and confronted Ali's supporters near Basra, demanding justice for Uthman's death. Ali rallied his supporters and confronted Aisha's forces near Basra in 656. The conflict, known as the Battle of the Camel, was named after the camel on which Aisha directed her troops from within a howdah. Her forces were defeated, and approximately 10,000 Muslims were killed in what is considered the first major battle between Muslims.

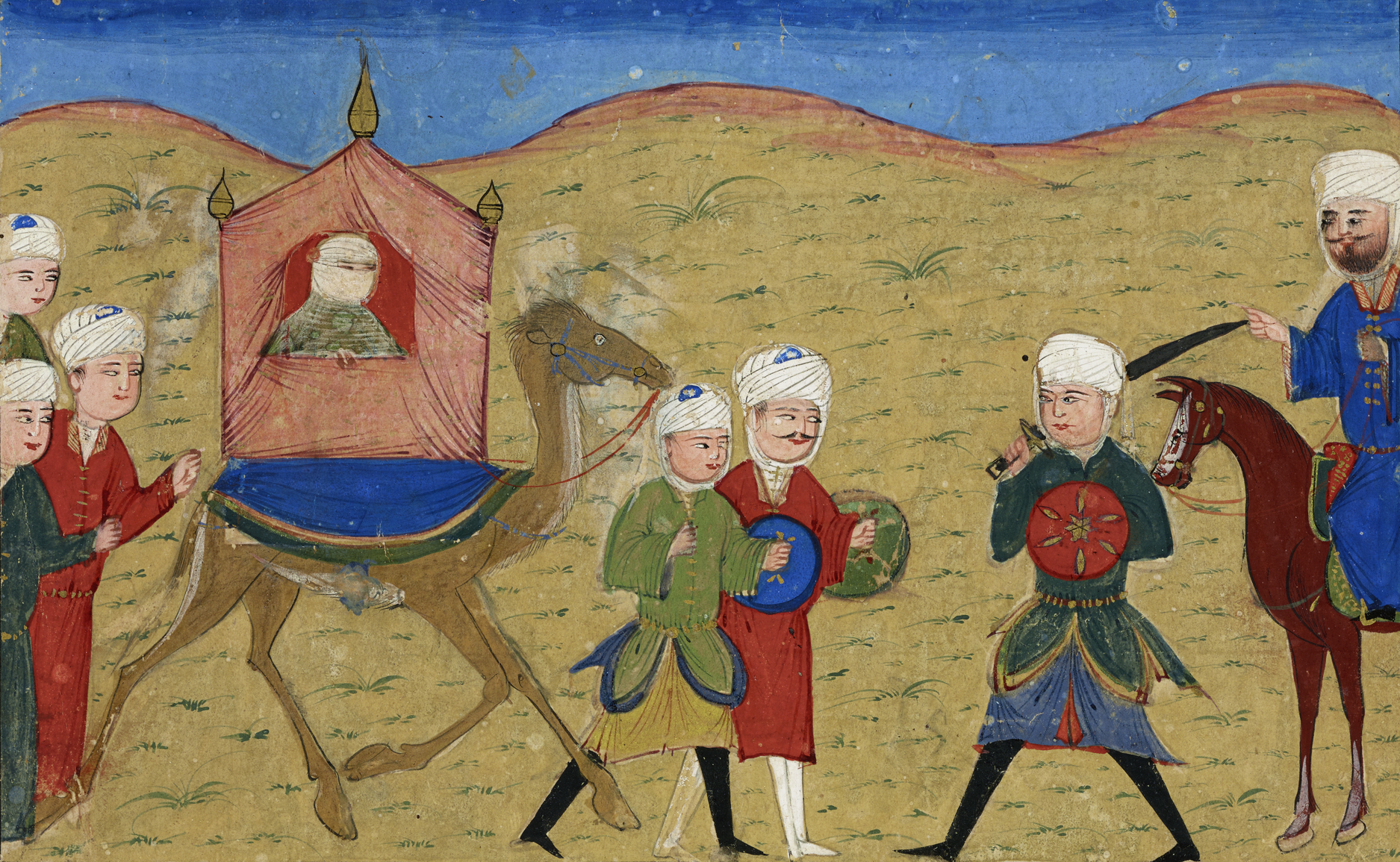
Persian miniature from the Compendium of Histories (Majma' al-tawarikh) by Hafiz-i Abru, depicting the Battle of the Camel, with Aisha opposing Ali

Following the battle, Ali reportedly reproached Aisha for her involvement but granted her a pardon. He arranged for her return to Medina under military escort led by her brother, Muhammad ibn Abi Bakr, who was one of his commanders. Aisha subsequently retired from political life and remained in Medina. According to some sources, Ali also arranged a pension for her as a gesture of respect. Due to her role in the battle, Shia Muslims generally hold a critical view of Aisha, despite Ali's decision to pardon her. Although Aisha withdrew from political affairs, the broader conflict between rival factions persisted, and the First Fitna continued.

=== Contributions to Islam and influence ===
Aisha's marriage has given her significance among many within Islamic culture, becoming known as the most learned woman of her time. She was also recognized during her lifetime as Muhammad's favorite. When Muhammad married Aisha in her youth, she was accessible "...to the values needed to lead and influence the sisterhood of Muslim women." Aisha conveyed ideas expressing Muhammad's practice (sunnah). She expressed herself as a role model to women, which can also be seen within some traditions attributed to her. The traditions regarding Aisha habitually opposed ideas unfavorable to women in efforts to elicit social change.

According to Reza Aslan:

The so-called Muslim women's movement is predicated on the idea that Muslim men, not Islam, have been responsible for the suppression of women's rights. For this reason, Muslim feminists throughout the world are advocating a return to the society Muhammad originally envisioned for his followers. Despite differences in culture, nationalities, and beliefs, these women believe that the lesson to be learned from Muhammad in Medina is that Islam is above all an egalitarian religion. Their Medina is a society in which Muhammad designated women like Umm Waraqa as spiritual guides for the Ummah; in which the Prophet himself was sometimes publicly rebuked by his wives; in which women prayed and fought alongside the men; in which women like Aisha and Umm Salama acted not only as religious but also as political—and on at least one occasion military—leaders; and in which the call to gather for prayer, bellowed from the rooftop of Muhammad's house, brought men and women together to kneel side by side and be blessed as a single undivided community.

Her intellectual contributions regarding the verbal texts of Islam were in time transcribed into written form, becoming the official history of Islam. Jawed Anwar also writes that Aisha was regarded as the most reliable source in the teachings of hadith. Aisha's authentication of Muhammad's ways of prayer and his recitation of the Qur'an allowed for the development of knowledge of his sunnah of praying and reading verses of the Quran.

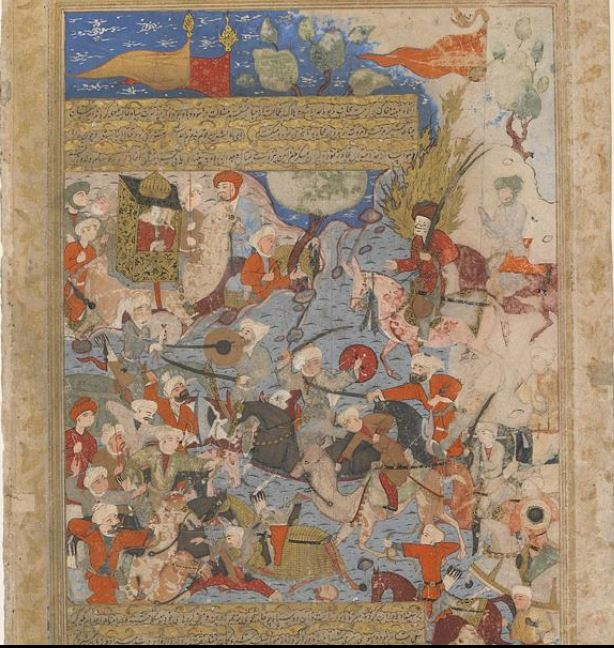
A 15th century Persian miniature depicting the Battle of the Camel narrative, between 'Alī, and Aisha, after Ali's victory, Aisha withdrew from politics. Traditionalists used this story to argue that women should not play an active political role, while modernists used it to argue for gender equality, which they believed existed within the Islamic tradition.

As the youngest wife of prophet Muhammad and the daughter of Abu Bakr, the first caliph of Islam, Aisha is revered by Sunni Islam for her contributions to narrating over 2,210 hadiths to multiple Sunni Hadith collections like Sahih Bukhari, Sahih Muslim, Sunan Abi Dawood and others.

Aisha holds a distinguished position among the transmitters of Hadith in early Islamic history. As one of the Prophet Muhammad's closest wives, she had direct access to his private life and was a first-hand witness to many events that others did not observe. Owing to her intelligence, sharp memory, and eloquence, she became a key authority in matters of Islamic jurisprudence, theology, and prophetic tradition and practices, also known as the Sunnah. According to Islamic scholars, she narrated over 2,200 hadiths that cover a wide range of topics including ritual practices, inheritance, ethics, and daily life. Many of these are recorded in major Sunni collections such as Sahih al-Bukhari, Sahih Muslim, Sunan Abi Dawood, and others.

Aisha's status as a scholar extended beyond narration; she also issued legal opinions (fatwas) and corrected companions on religious matters when needed. Companions like Abu Musa al-Ash'ari and Urwah ibn al-Zubayr are reported to have frequently consulted her on complex issues. Her contribution was particularly critical in the field of women's issues, where her perspective was unique and invaluable. Classical Islamic scholars such as Ibn Shihab al-Zuhri, Ibn Sa'd, and Ibn Hajar al-Asqalani praised her depth of knowledge and reliability. Her legacy in hadith transmission continues to be a foundational part of Sunni Islam's understanding of the Prophet's life and teachings.

=== Political influence ===
Spellberg argues that Aisha's political influence helped promote her father, Abu Bakr, to the caliphate after Muhammad's death.

After the defeat at the Battle of the Camel, Aisha retreated to Medina and became a teacher. Upon her arrival in Medina, Aisha retired from her public role in politics. Her discontinuation of public politics did not stop her political influence completely. Privately, Aisha continued influencing those intertwined in the Islamic political sphere. Among the Islamic community, she was known as an intelligent woman who debated law with male companions. Aisha was also considered to be the embodiment of proper rituals while partaking in the pilgrimage to Mecca, a journey she made with several groups of women. For the last two years of her life, Aisha spent much of her time telling the stories of Muhammad, hoping to correct false passages that had become influential in formulating Islamic law. Due to this, Aisha's political influence continues to impact Muslims.

== Death ==
Aisha died at her home in Medina on 17 Ramadan 58 AH (16 July 678). (Note: This is the generally accepted date, although the actual date of death is not known for certain.) She was 67 years old. Abu Hurayra led her funeral prayer after the tahajjud (night) prayer, and she was buried at al-Baqi cemetery.

== See also ==
- List of people related to Quranic verses
- Muhammad's wives
- The Jewel of Medina (fictional work based loosely on Aisha's existence)
- Child marriage
- Shia view of Aisha
