= In Pursuit of the Unknown =

2012 nonfiction book by mathematician Ian Stewart

In Pursuit of the Unknown 17 Equations That Changed the World
- First edition (US)
- Author: Ian Stewart
- Language: English
- Genre: Non-fiction
- Publisher: Profile Books (UK); Basic Books (US)
- Publication date: February 2012
- Publication place: United Kingdom
- Media type: Print (hardcover)
- Pages: 352
- ISBN: 978-1-84668-531-6
- Preceded by: Cows in the Maze: And Other Mathematical Explorations (2010)
- Followed by: Symmetry: A Very Short Introduction (2013)

In Pursuit of the Unknown: 17 Equations That Changed the World is a 2012 nonfiction book by British mathematician Ian Stewart FRS CMath FIMA, published by Basic Books. In the book, Stewart traces the history of the role of mathematics in human history, beginning with the Pythagorean theorem to the equation that transformed twenty-first century financial markets, the Black–Scholes model.

== Content ==
Seventeen equations are described in the book as follows:

#	Equation name	Equation
1	Pythagorean theorem	$a^2 + b^2 = c^2$
2	Logarithms (logarithm product identity)	$\log{xy} = \log{x} + \log{y}$
3	Calculus (definition of the derivative)	$\frac{df}{dt} = \lim_{h \to 0} \frac{f(t+h)-f(t)}h$
4	Newton's law of gravity	$F = G\frac{m_1 m_2}{d^2}$
5	Square root of minus one	$i^2 = -1$
6	Euler's formula for polyhedra	$F-E+V= 2$
7	Normal distribution	$\mathbf{\Phi}(x) = \frac{1}{\sqrt{2\pi\sigma^2}} \mathrm{e}^{-\frac{(x-\mu)^2}{2\sigma^2}}$
8	Wave equation (one dimensional)	$\frac{ \partial^2 u}{\partial t^2 } = c^2 \frac{ \partial^2 u}{\partial x^2 }$
9	Fourier transform	$\hat{f}(\xi) = \int_{-\infty}^{\infty} f(x)\ e^{-2\pi i x \xi} \, dx$
10	Navier–Stokes equations (for conservation of momentum)	$\rho \left(\frac{\partial \mathbf{v}}{\partial t} + \mathbf{v} \cdot \nabla \mathbf{v}\right) = - \nabla p + \nabla \cdot \mathbf{T} + \mathbf{f}$
11	Maxwell's equations (in vacuum, in Gaussian units)	$\nabla \cdot \mathbf{E} = 0\,;$ $\nabla \cdot \mathbf{H} = 0\,;$ $\nabla \times \mathbf{E} = -\frac{1}{c}\frac{\partial \mathbf{H}} {\partial t}\, ;$ $\nabla \times \mathbf{H} = \frac1c \frac{\partial \mathbf{E}} {\partial t} \,.$
12	Second law of thermodynamics	$dS \geq 0$
13	Relativity (Mass–energy equivalence)	$E = mc^2$
14	Schrödinger equation	$i \hbar \frac{\partial}{\partial t} \Psi = \hat{H}\Psi$
15	Information theory (Shannon entropy)	$H = - \sum_x p(x) \log p(x)$
16	Chaos theory (logistic map)	$x_{t+1} = k x_t \left(1-x_t\right)$
17	Black–Scholes equation	$\frac{1}{2}\sigma^2 S^2 \frac{\partial^2 V}{\partial S^2} + rS\frac{\partial V}{\partial S} + \frac{\partial V}{\partial t} - rV = 0$

== Reviews ==
Kirkus Reviews said that the book provided "clear, cogent explanations of how the equations work without burdening the reader with cumbersome derivations."

The Maclean's magazine review described the book as a "history of the human species told in equations" by the "finest living math popularizer".

The New York Times Book Reviews said that Stewart was a "genius in the way he conveys his excitement and sense of wonder across" who has a "valuable grasp" of "what it takes to make equations interesting" and "to make science cool."

The Physics Today review said that Stewart writes with "easy prose, which never fails to both educate and entertain."

Business Insider described the book as an "excellent and deeply researched book."

The Association for Computing Machinery's SIGACT News review called the book, the "latest spell" by the "master storyteller", the "Honorary Wizard of the Unseen University"—the "master storyteller"—who is able to "entertain" the reader with Greek symbols. The reviewer said Stewart focused on how equations have changed the world, as new equations gave "birth to new branches of science". Stewart provides the "historical background" to explain "how the equation was anticipated", how people then "generalized the ideas and formalized the results". He highlights the ways in which these equations continue to influence our lives in the twenty-first century.

The review in the Notices of the American Mathematical Society described Stewart as an "experienced writer" whose intended audience is the "general literate reader"—not mathematicians. The reviewer, a mathematician, said that Stewart was "generally successful in getting the essential points across in a nontechnical way without too much distortion. However, he personally would have preferred a less "discursive style" but acknowledged that Stewart's writing was appropriate for his intended audience.

== Themes ==
"The Black–Scholes equation changed the world by creating a booming quadrillion-dollar industry; its generalisations, used unintelligently by a small coterie of bankers, changed the world again by contributing to a multitrillion-dollar financial crash whose ever more malign effects, now extending to entire national economics, are still being felt worldwide."

— In Pursuit of the Unknown 2012:310

In 17 Equations, Stewart described how the Black-Scholes equation provided the "mathematical justification for the trading"—and therefore—"one ingredient in a rich stew of financial irresponsibility, political ineptitude, perverse incentives and lax regulation" that contributed to the 2008 financial crisis. He clarified that "the equation itself wasn't the real problem", but its abuse in the financial industry.

== See also ==
- Stewart, Ian; Basic Books (2017). Significant Figures: the lives and work of great mathematicians. New York: Basic Books. p. 303. ISBN 978-0-465-09612-1. OCLC 1030547312.
