= Heaven (Stewart and Cohen novel) =

2004 science fiction novel by Ian Stewart and Jack Cohen

- First edition (publ. Warner Books)
- Author: Ian Stewart and Jack Cohen
- Genre: Science fiction
- Publisher: Warner Books
- ISBN: 978-0-446-52983-9

Heaven is a 2004 science fiction novel by British mathematician Ian Stewart and British biologist Jack Cohen. It is a loose sequel to Wheelers.

The novel features spacefaring Neanderthals who were removed from Earth by powerful aliens for unspecified reasons.
