= Concepts of Modern Mathematics =

Book by Ian Stewart

- First edition
- Author: Ian Stewart
- Language: English
- Subject: Mathematics
- Genre: Non-fiction
- Publisher: Pelican Books
- Publication date: 1975
- Publication place: United Kingdom
- Media type: Print
- Pages: 352 pages
- ISBN: 0-14-021849-1
- OCLC: 2020912
- Dewey Decimal: 510
- LC Class: QA93 .S73

Concepts of Modern Mathematics is a book by mathematician and science popularizer Ian Stewart about then-recent developments in mathematics. It was originally published by Penguin Books in 1975, updated in 1981, and reprinted by Dover publications in 1995 and 2015.

== Overview ==
The book arose out of an extramural class that Ian Stewart taught at the University of Warwick about "Modern mathematics". In the 1995 Dover edition Stewart wrote that the aim of the class was:

to explain why the underlying abstract point of view had gained currency among research mathematicians, and to examine how it opened up entirely new realms of mathematical thought.

The book is aimed at non-mathematicians. However, there are frequent equations and diagrams and the level of presentation is more technical than some of Stewart's other popular books such as Flatterland. Topics covered include analytic geometry, set theory, abstract algebra, group theory, topology, and probability.
