= John Donatich =

Writer

John Donatich was the Director of Yale University Press.

== Early life ==
He received a BA from New York University in 1982. He also got a master's degree from NYU in 1984.'.

== Career ==
John Donatich's writing has appeared in various periodicals including Harper's, The Atlantic Monthly and The Village Voice.

He worked at HarperCollins from 1992 to 1996, serving as director of national accounts and then as vice president and director of product and marketing development.

From 1995 to 2003, Donatich served as publisher and vice president of Basic Books. While there, he started the Art of Mentoring series of books, which would run from 2001 to 2008. While at Basic Books, Donatich published such authors as Christopher Hitchens, Steven Pinker, Samantha Power, Alan Dershowitz, Sir Martin Rees and Richard Florida.

In 2003, Donatich became the director of the Yale University Press. At Yale, Donatich published such authors as Michael Walzer, Janet Malcolm, E. H. Gombrich, Michael Fried, Edmund Morgan and T. J. Clark. Donatich began the Margellos World Republic of Letters, a literature in translation series that published such authors as Adonis, Norman Manea and Claudio Magris, as well as the Nobel laureates Patrick Modiano, Elfriede Jelinek and Annie Ernaux. He also launched the digital archive platform, The Stalin Digital Archive and the Yale Art and Architecture e-Portal. He retired as director in 2025.

He is the author of a memoir, Ambivalence, a Love Story, and a novel, The Variations.

== Books ==
- Ambivalence, a Love Story: Portrait of a Marriage (memoir), St. Martin's Press, 2005.
- The Variations (novel), Henry Holt, March, 2012

== Articles ==
- Why Books Still Matter, Journal of Scholarly Publishing, Volume 40, Number 4, July 2009, pp. 329–342, E-ISSN 1710-1166 Print ISSN 1198-9742

== Personal life ==
Donatich is married to Betsy Lerner, a literary agent and author; together they have a daughter, Raffaella.
