= Jack Cohen (biologist) =

British reproductive biologist and author (1933–2019)

Jack Cohen FRSB (19 September 1933 – 6 May 2019) was a British reproductive biologist also known for his science books and involvement with science fiction.

== Life ==
Cohen was born 19 September 1933 in Norwich, but grew up in Stoke Newington. His father was killed shortly after the end of the Second World War, 1 September 1945. His grandfather was a rabbi and Cohen was an observant Jew in his youth. He continued to attend the synagogue for cultural reasons. He was married three times and had six children.

== Academic career ==
Cohen studied at University College, Hull, where he obtained a BSc (external degree of the University of London) in 1954. He obtained his PhD in zoology at the same institution (by then Hull University) in 1957. He went to the University of Birmingham for post-doctoral work and was appointed lecturer in the Department of Zoology and Comparative physiology in 1959. He worked for a year at Harvard Medical School then returned to Birmingham as a senior lecturer in 1968, a position he held until 1987. His former students include Sir Paul Nurse, winner of the 2001 Nobel Prize for Medicine. In 1974 the University of Birmingham awarded him a DSc for his work.

From 1987 to 1989 he was senior embryological advisor and manager of laboratories at the IVF/Infertility Clinic of a London private hospital. From 1995 to 1996 he was visiting professor at the Weizmann Institute, Israel. From 1996 to 2000 he was a consultant at the University of Warwick, jointly to the Ecosystems Unit of the Biology Dept and the Mathematics Institute. He was an honorary professor at the Mathematics Institute of the University of Warwick and a visiting professor at Durham Business School.

He published in prestigious journals such as Nature and wrote textbooks such as Living Embryos – an Introduction to the Study of Animal Development (1967) and Reproduction (1977). His theory of sperm redundancy was important in studies of fertility and treatment of infertility.

== Other activities ==
Cohen worked as a consultant for science fiction television shows and science fiction novels regarding the creation of plausible aliens. The writers who acknowledged his assistance included Anne McCaffrey for the Dragonriders of Pern; Harry Harrison for his Eden trilogy; Larry Niven, Jerry Pournelle and Steven Barnes for their Legacy of Heorot; James White of Sector General fame; David Gerrold for the Chtorr ecology; and Terry Pratchett for several works.

Cohen and fellow University of Warwick researcher Ian Stewart, a mathematician, collaborated with Terry Pratchett to write four Science of Discworld books, which accompany his Discworld series. Pratchett made them both "Honorary Wizards of the Unseen University" at the same 1999 ceremony where the University of Warwick gave Pratchett an honorary degree. Anne McCaffrey dedicated All the Weyrs of Pern (1991) to Jack and Judy Cohen and credited Jack with making fact of her fiction.

Cohen and Stewart also co-authored books on epistemology.

Cohen was a member of the high IQ society Mensa. He was one of the small groups of British Mensans who persuaded science fiction author Isaac Asimov to visit the United Kingdom in June 1974.

He had a long-standing interest in the design and natural balance of (particularly manmade) lake ecosystems, having designed new filtration systems but also led in reinstating Victorian designed systems at various locations around the UK (once describing Victorian ecosystems as failures of Frobenius integrability.)

In 2009, he became a patron of the anti-circumcision charity NORM-UK.

His hobbies, according to the author profiles in his books, included boomerang-throwing and keeping strange animals. In fact, he kept a salt water aquarium and carefully nurtured a colony of amoebae for over 30 years, observations of which provided many useful ideas (Personal Communication with Jack Cohen, 2009. Communicated by William Sulis.)

== Books ==
- The Science of Discworld, with Ian Stewart and Terry Pratchett
- The Science of Discworld II: The Globe, with Ian Stewart and Terry Pratchett
- The Science of Discworld III: Darwin's Watch, with Ian Stewart and Terry Pratchett
- The Science of Discworld IV: Judgement Day, with Ian Stewart and Terry Pratchett
- Figments of Reality, with Ian Stewart (non-fiction)
- The Collapse of Chaos, with Ian Stewart (non-fiction)
- Evolving the Alien: The Science of Extraterrestrial Life, with Ian Stewart. The American and second editions were published as What Does a Martian Look Like? The Science of Extraterrestrial Life
- Wheelers, with Ian Stewart (fiction)
- Heaven (fiction), with Ian Stewart, ISBN 0-446-52983-4, Aspect (May 2004)
- Living Embryos, Pergamon (1967)
- Reproduction, Butterworths (1977)
- Spermatozoa, Antibodies and Infertility (1978) with W. F. Hendry
- Living Embryos (1981) with B. D. Massey
- Animal Reproduction: parents making parents (1984) with B. D. Massey
- The Privileged Ape (1989)
- Stop Working and Start Thinking (2000) with Graham Medley
