= Juan Andrés (convert) =

Spanish Muslim scholar and convert to Catholicism

- Born: 15th century Xàtiva, Spain
- Died: 16th century (?)
- Occupations: scholar, priest
- Writing career
- Pen name: alfaquí
- Period: Renaissance
- Genre: Christian polemic against Islam
- Notable works: Confusion de la secta mahomatica (Valencia, 1515)

Juan Andrés (Latin: Joannes Andreas; fl. 1487–1515), is the name chosen by a Spanish Muslim scholar who converted to Catholicism and wrote a well known polemical work against Islam, Confusion or Confutation of the Mohammedan Sect and of the Qur'an (Spanish: Confusión o confutación de la secta mahomética y del Alcorán).

== Life ==
The man subsequently known as Juan Andrés was born in Xàtiva, Spain, the son of an Islamic scholar. Trained as a faqīh himself, he converted to Catholicism in 1487 and was baptised in Valencia Cathedral, taking the Christian name Juan Andrés. Becoming a priest, he was made an envoy by the Catholic Monarchs Ferdinand and Isabella, to preach Christianity in Granada after it was reconquered. He worked closely with the Aragonese Inquisitor Martín García. He later claims to have translated the Qur'an into "Aragonese," although no copy of this text survives.

Around 1516, there was a canon of Granada Cathedral by the name Juan Andrés, but it is not certain that this was the same man.

== Works ==
Juan Andrés' main apologetical work, Confusion de la secta mahomatica y del alcoran (Valencia, 1515), while written to encourage Muslims to convert to Christianity, was later banned by the Spanish Inquisition due to the extensive quotations from the Qur'an that it contained. It nevertheless went into many further editions. Particularly notable among the work's polemical points is that it contains one of the earliest explicit condemnations of Muhammad's marriage to Aisha for her young age.

The Confusion de la secta mahomatica was translated into Italian as Opera chiamata confusione della setta Machumetana (Venice, 1537; reprinted 1540, 1545, 1597), then from Italian into French as Confusion de la secte de Muhamed (Paris, 1574) and into Latin as Confusio sectae Mahometanae (Leipzig, 1595). It was translated from Spanish into Dutch as Een zeer wonderlycke ende waerachtighe historie van Mahomet (Antwerp, 1580), and from Latin into German as Confusio Sectae Mahometanae: darinnen deß Mahomets Ursprung, Ankunfft, Leben vnd Tod (Leipzig, 1598). An English translation bore the title The Confusion of Muhamed's Sect (London, 1652). Citations and allusions to this book can be found in Christian anti-Muslim literature into the 20th century.

A second book has also been attributed to him, Sumario breve de la pratica de la arithmetica (Valencia, 1515), but with some doubt as to whether this is the same Juan Andrés.
