= The Science of Discworld II: The Globe =

2002 book by Terry Pratchett, Ian Stewart and Jack Cohen

- First edition
- Authors: Terry Pratchett, Ian Stewart & Jack Cohen
- Cover artist: Paul Kidby
- Language: English
- Series: Discworld; 2nd science novel
- Subject: History of Earth; Stories Characters Rincewind, Unseen University Staff, Hex, Granny Weatherwax Locations Unseen University, Roundworld
- Genre: Fantasy
- Published: 2002 (Ebury Press)
- ISBN: 0-09-188805-0
- Preceded by: The Science of Discworld
- Followed by: The Science of Discworld III: Darwin's Watch

The Science of Discworld II: The Globe is a 2002 book written by British novelist Terry Pratchett and science writers Ian Stewart and Jack Cohen. It is a sequel to The Science of Discworld, and is followed by The Science of Discworld III: Darwin's Watch.

The book alternates between a typically absurd Discworld story and serious scientific exposition.

Where the first book centred on the origins of the universe, earth and the beginnings of life, the second part follows the modern history of Earth. The central theme in the book is that in order for humans to understand anything it must be encapsulated in a story. In the fictional part of the book this is symbolized by the fictional element 'narrativium'. The science section suggests that, rather than Homo sapiens (Wise Man), we might be better described as Pan narrans (Storytelling Chimpanzee).

== Plot summary ==
In the story, the wizards accidentally are transported to Roundworld (the real universe, inadvertently created during the first book) during the Elizabethan era. This is the first time they learn there are humans on Roundworld; they previously learnt that something would escape an Ice Age by heading for the stars via a space elevator, but missed which species it was. They are befriended by the magician John Dee, who is understandably confused by their appearance. Back at Unseen University, the thinking machine Hex informs the remaining faculty (Ponder Stibbons, the Librarian and Rincewind) that history has changed and humanity no longer makes it to the stars. The reason for this is, apparently, an infestation of elves feeding off human imagination and encouraging them to be scared of the dark and the monsters within.

The wizards travel back in time to suppress the elvish influence, but this only makes things worse; people are no longer superstitious, but they are no longer creative either. In the "new" 17th century humans are still in the Stone Age, with a particular tribe having only slight fascination about a tree. Then Rincewind suggests doing the opposite, encouraging humanity to be more creative. They travel through time doing this, with the intent of creating a history in which William Shakespeare writes A Midsummer Night's Dream. This achievement is symbolic of a new way of thinking, the human imagination is now sophisticated enough that stories can be told about stories. With the elves now seen as a harmless fiction, their power over Roundworld is gone.

== Ideas and themes ==
The science section explains that, apart from the wizards, this is probably how humanity and science developed; the imagination that peopled the night with terrors went on to create a story in which there was a reliable light source, and made that story reality. While Roundworld does not, as explained in the first book, contain any narrativium, human belief that it should have created something very similar.

The book concludes with: "The [stories] we've got have brought us a long way. Plenty of creatures are intelligent but only one tells stories. That's us: Pan narrans. And what about Homo sapiens? Yes, we think that would be a very good idea ..."

The concept of narrativium (a fictional element responsible for the creation of narrative, a parody of phlogiston), introduced in the first book in the series and developed in this volume, has been used by Pratchett and his co-authors to explore the role of narratives in real-world literature and science.

== Reception ==
The book and its prequel, the original The Science of Discworld, have been reviewed by Ian C.W Hardy for Trends in Ecology & Evolution. Hardy writes that in the second book, the authors "critically explore religion, art, philosophy of science, visual processing in the brain, hearing, language, information theory, chaos, adaptive radiation, elephants, genes and, yes, memes and much more". He concluded that the books are a "fun" and "engaging" example of popular science writing.

Alison Bailey reviewed the book for Biologist, noting that the book's "science chapters are fascinating treasure troves", if a bit chaotic at times.

Roger Bridgman who reviewed the book for New Scientist, wrote that it "contains a lot of solid science and maths, much of it debunking the traditional tosh in other popular science books. So if you're interested in human origins, and like your ideas laced with farce of the Pratchett kind, you'll find it entertaining, instructive and illuminating".

== See also ==
- Round World version of Tolkien's legendarium
