= Castoff (publishing) =

In book publishing, casting off is the process of estimating the number of signatures required to typeset a manuscript. An accurate castoff (or cast off) is important because the page length of a book affects many variables, including the cost of producing the book, the cover price, how many books can fit in a carton, and the width of the spine.

Casting off generally begins by counting the words or characters in the manuscript, usually using a word processor or text editor. This word count is then divided by an estimate of the number of words or characters per full page of a model book, i.e., a previously published book with approximately the same trim size and type specifications to be applied to the manuscript.

The editor must then account for anything else that will add pages to the finished book, such as half-title and title pages, the copyright page, part-title pages, chapter openers, photographs, illustrations, charts, tables, or lines of poetry. In addition, the editor must anticipate any elements that will be added later in proofs, such as a preface or index.

Once the editor has estimated the pages required to typeset the book, it must be rounded to the nearest multiple of sixteen (a signature) or eight (a half-signature) by adding blank pages or killing (editing so as to remove) pages. Editors tend to round up rather than down, because if the book requires more pages than anticipated, it will cost more to produce, but fewer pages and therefore lower production costs are less problematic.

While some software exists to help editors in accurately casting off manuscripts, even an experienced editor often can't foresee the many variables that will affect a book's length, some of which may not arise until the book is well into production.
