= From Here to Infinity (book) =

1996 book by Ian Stewart

- Author: Ian Stewart
- Language: English
- Subject: Mathematics
- Genre: Non-fiction
- Publisher: Oxford University Press
- Publication date: 1987, 1992, 1996
- Publication place: United Kingdom
- Media type: Print
- Pages: 310 pp.
- ISBN: 978-0-192-86148-1 (new ed.)

From Here to Infinity: A Guide to Today's Mathematics, a 1996 book by mathematician and science popularizer Ian Stewart, is a guide to modern mathematics for the general reader. It aims to answer questions such as what mathematics is, what it is for, and what mathematicians are doing. Author Simon Singh describes it as "An interesting and accessible account of current mathematical topics".

== Summary ==
After an introductory chapter The Nature of Mathematics, Stewart devotes each of the following 18 chapters to an exposition of a particular problem that has given rise to new mathematics or an area of research in modern mathematics.

- Chapter 2 – The Price of Primality – primality tests and integer factorisation
- Chapter 3 – Marginal Interest – Fermat's Last Theorem
- Chapter 4 – Parallel Thinking – non-Euclidean geometry
- Chapter 5 – The Miraculous Jar – Cantor's theorem and cardinal numbers
- Chapter 6 – Ghosts of Departed Quantities – calculus and non-standard analysis
- Chapter 7 – The Duellist and the Monster – the classification of finite simple groups
- Chapter 8 – The Purple Wallflower – the four colour theorem
- Chapter 9 – Much Ado About Knotting – topology and the Poincaré conjecture
- Chapter 10 – More Ado About Knotting – knot polynomials
- Chapter 11 – Squarerooting the Unsquarerootable – complex numbers and the Riemann hypothesis
- Chapter 12 – Squaring the Unsquarable – the Banach–Tarski paradox
- Chapter 13 – Strumpet Fortune – probability and random walks
- Chapter 14 – The Mathematics of Nature – the stability of the Solar System
- Chapter 15 – The Patterns of Chaos – chaos theory and strange attractors
- Chapter 16 – The Two-and-a-halfth Dimension – fractals
- Chapter 17 – Dixit Algorizmi – algorithms and NP-complete problems
- Chapter 18 – The Limits of Computability – Turing machines and computable numbers
- Chapter 19 – The Ultimate in Technology Transfer – experimental mathematics and the relationship between mathematics and science

== Editions ==
Important advances in mathematics necessitated revisions of the book. For example, when the 1st edition came out, Fermat's Last Theorem was still an open problem. By the 3rd edition, it has been solved by Andrew Wiles. Other revised topics include Tarski's circle-squaring problem, Carmichael numbers, and the Kepler Problem.

- 1st edition (1987): published under the title The Problems of Mathematics
- 2nd edition (1992)
- retitled/revised edition (1996)
