= Figments of Reality =

1997 book by Jack Cohen and Ian Stewart

- Hardcover edition
- Author: Jack Cohen and Ian Stewart
- Language: English
- Subject: Sociobiology
- Genre: Non-fiction
- Publisher: Cambridge University Press
- Publication date: 1997
- Publication place: United Kingdom
- Pages: 339 pp.
- ISBN: 0-521-57155-3
- OCLC: 36017160
- Dewey Decimal: 153.4/2 21
- LC Class: BF311 .S679 1997

Figments of Reality: The Evolution of the Curious Mind (1997) is a book about the evolution of the intelligent and conscious human mind by biologist Jack Cohen and mathematician Ian Stewart.

== Overview ==
In this book Cohen and Stewart give their ideas on how the sentient human being evolved. Various chapters discuss scientific and philosophical ideas such as emergence and chaos, free will, perception versus reality, objectivity versus subjectivity, self-awareness, the ego and id, groupthink, and extelligence. A theme is that the traditional reductionist approach of trying to understand things as interaction of simpler things can not alone explain such complex concepts as intelligence or culture. To better understand them one has to consider also the context in which they have evolved and the fact that the evolution is a recursive process, often changing the context so that previously unseen evolutionary paths became available. The authors claim that intelligence is an inevitable result of letting evolution progress for long enough.

Topics are illustrated with humorous science fiction snippets dealing with a hypothetical alien intelligence, the Zarathustrians, whom Cohen and Stewart use as metaphors of the human mind itself, an alternative evolution story, and various philosophical concepts.
