= Wheelers (novel) =

2000 novel by Ian Stewart and Jack Cohen

- First edition
- Author: Ian Stewart & Jack Cohen
- Cover artist: Bob Eggleton
- Language: English
- Genre: Science fiction
- Publisher: Warner Books
- Publication date: 2000
- Publication place: United States
- Media type: Print
- Pages: 498
- Followed by: Heaven

Wheelers is a hard science fiction novel written by English mathematician Ian Stewart and reproductive biologist Jack Cohen. The book was originally released in hardcover form in the year 2000, and a more common paperback printing was begun in 2001. It has enjoyed modest commercial success and is perhaps best known for its conceptions of alien zoology and intelligence—hallmarks of Cohen's work as a consultant on exobiology for books, movies, and television.

Though this is the first time the pair has written a fictional narrative of their own, both Stewart and Cohen have worked continually with friend and fantasy author Terry Pratchett on his best-selling Discworld series.

== Plot summary ==
Wheelers chronicles mankind's first contact with an alien intelligence, a meeting which takes place out of necessity when a rogue asteroid enters the Solar System and is set on a collision course with Earth by an advanced and hitherto unknown Jovian species as a way of avoiding a devastating impact to their own world.

The story opens with a feeling of anachronism, as two of the novel's central characters (Charles Dunsmoore, a career archaeologist and his volatile graduate student Prudence Odingo) work in the year 2194 to interpret and preserve artifacts found in the vicinity of the Great Sphinx, which is being disassembled to save it from the advancing waters of a clogged and flooding Nile River after the collapse of the Aswan Dam. A lover's quarrel between the two sends Prudence off in a blind rage, and leaves Dunsmoore the sole caretaker of an important discovery—a position which catapults his career and sets the tension for the novel's second half.

Professionally and personally embittered by the success of Dunsmoore, Prudence begins a life of semi-legal interplanetary exploration (referenced by the book but never fully explained) and makes a living selling cosmic oddities to the highest black market bidder. This dangerous and profitable lifestyle acquaints her with legal authorities as well as the Belters—a group of Zen Buddhists (known as The Order of the Cuckoo) who have populated and mined both Earth's Moon and the asteroid belt that lies between the terrestrial planets and the Jovian worlds of the outer Solar System. Her smuggling career culminates with the discovery of a trove of buried, wheeled, and presumably alien artefacts on Callisto. She takes these 'wheelers' to Earth intending to sell them, but a government investigation headed by Dunsmoore concludes them to be inauthentic.

As the story progresses, another main character materialises in the form of the aptly named Moses Odingo, son of Prudence's sister Charity and animal-handler extraordinaire. His life becomes one of the novel's several core plots, circumstance and apparent fate conspiring to send him on a worldwide journey of hardship and tribulation.

During this time, both Earth-bound scientists and the Belters notice that the innermost moons of Jupiter have mysteriously realigned, altering the trajectory of a once unimportant comet and setting in motion a direct collision with Earth. This is courtesy of the stuffily bureaucratic blimps—intelligent extraterrestrials living in the turbulence of Jupiter's upper atmosphere whose advanced gravity technology allows them to alter the orbital plane of the planet's moons and thereby avoid the type of cometary impact which, obliquely, precipitated their exodus from an unknown 'Firsthome' to Jupiter itself.

Left with twelve years until impact and now convinced of the wheelers' authenticity, Earth's governmental authorities speed a mission to the Jovian satellites in hopes of contacting the as yet unseen alien lifeforms. Dunsmoore is selected to lead the group, with the assumption that his experience with decrypting anthropological artefacts on earth will aid in establishing communiqué with the Jovians. The years tick by without consequence as Dunsmoore and his team search in vain for evidence of alien life on Jupiter's moons, convinced by terrestrial scientists that the planet itself is entirely inhospitable to life (he is warned of the danger of this erroneous presupposition by, appropriately enough, contemporary science-fiction authors).

As the tension on Earth grows unbearable, Prudence Odingo flies her personal craft out to give Dunsmoore's team a push in what she believes to be the correct direction. Hacking into one of the probes that Dunsmoore's been carefully bobbing around the lifeless stratosphere of Jupiter, Odingo's team sends the remote control vehicle into the lower atmosphere, immediately encountering alien lifeforms both advanced and simplistic.

Through a quirk of fate and timing, her team manages to save a blimp by the name of Bright Halfholder of the Violent Foam, part of a 'skydiving' rebel faction known as The Instrumentality. Odingo encourages Moses, now a young man, to make a harrowing high-speed journey out to the moons, hoping to use his uncanny knack for animal communication to establish a rapport with Halfholder.

The ploy works, but the Jovians—who live for millions of years and rely on an arcane and tedious system of legal councils—spend too long arguing and contemplating to successfully redirect the comet. The Instrumentality stages a successful coup, but in the end it is Dunsmoore (who has been redeemed by the threat to his home planet) who hijacks the alien gravity technology and pilots Io into a diversionary orbit around the comet itself, barely saving Earth from total annihilation—though millions die as the remnants of the comet and the sulphurous outgassing of ruined Io cascade into Earth.

== Government in the novel ==
The book pits the earth and its inhabitants against a universe of diplomatic but equally narcissistic alien lifeforms.

=== Human ===
- Earth in the novel is divided into two enormous political conglomerates—those of Ecotopia and Free China. These are demarcated by the contemporary political, economic, and cultural divisions between the Western and Eastern Worlds.
- Free China shares similarities with today's People's Republic; for instance, there is an emphasis on traditional Chinese culture and medicine (the trade in poached animals for the purposes of concocting elixirs and potions from their bones is an important plot point in the novel). Further parallels to modern China include purposeful isolationism and two-way information control.

=== Blimp ===
- The blimps are for the most part egalitarian on an individual basis, but their governance is handled at the topmost levels by an oligarchical group of Elders who are constantly mired in mindlessly bureaucratic detail that makes any decision a lengthy process. They are aided by administratively minded symbiauts which take the roles of secretaries and stenographers, reinforcing the council members' natural memory for bylaws and precedents.
- Blimp culture has been irrevocably shaped by the tragic loss of Firsthome, and the society at large has come to value personal safety over individualism or cosmic equanimity.
- The Instrumentality is a rebellious faction which is ostensibly concerned with the possibility that redirected comets might impact intelligent life on other planets—even Poisonblue, as they call the Earth. Despite this seeming goodwill, the blimp Halfholder comes to understand through the course of the novel that they are as much concerned with political gain as moral fortitude.
- Skydiving, or free-falling from one floating blimp city in the attempt to land on another, is an illegal activity used by rebellious groups or individuals to demonstrate against the current order. This wanton disregard for personal safety flies in the face of established protocol and is therefore considered punishable in the extreme.

== Technologies in the novel ==
Wheelers, which begins in the year 2210, is set over a backdrop of future technologies which play a role—though not an especially defining one—in the story.

=== Human technology ===
Due to The Pause (a period of time in which fears over unreliable A.I. all but halted forward progress), there is a mix of far-flung futurism and relatively mundane tech.

==== Personal communication ====
- The Internet has been replaced by the Xnet, commonly referred to as 'the X.' Much like the 'net today, it facilitates communication, information exchange, hacking, and even personal navigation (courtesy of a GPS-like orbital tracking system).
- All citizens of Ecotopia wear wristnodes (often shortened to 'nodes) which allow personal communication and access to the Xnet, presumably through some intuitive holographic display.
- Television has been replaced by vidivid technology, or VV for short. Details are scarce, but the implication is that it, like a wristnode display, is holographic.

==== Conveyance ====
- Cars and trucks are the average means of travel for the citizens of Ectopia and Free China, but government agencies and elite clandestine operations may own helicopters.
- Spaceships are available, but remain expensive luxuries. Prudence Odingo owes hers, the Tiglath-Pileser, to services rendered for the Order of the Cuckoo. There is no interstellar travel in human hands, though late in the novel a system of slingshot rocks are used to propel Moses' travel to speeds far beyond those attainable by conventional engines.
- The Order itself owns a giant hollowed-out asteroid which has been made to recreate the majesty of Tibet (the original home of The Order, now under the power of Free China—much like today). Like the giant alien ship of Arthur C. Clarke's 1973 novel Rendezvous with Rama, the New Tibet Habitat contains an artificial world complete with sacred mountains like Chumulangma and achieves normal gravity via centripetal force.

==== Gravity tech ====
- The Order of the Cuckoo, who continued advancing during The Pause and who make a living shuffling around and subsequently mining large asteroids, have developed mass drivers. The novel describes these as "linear trebuchets powered by magnetic induction motors." By manipulating a gravity field with pure mass, they can alter the course of the relatively hefty pieces of iron and other metals that The Order deals in.

=== Blimp technology ===
Blimp technology is organic in nature, and is constructed biologically using pheromones and other chemical tools.

==== Cities ====
- Blimp cities are alive. Made of the combined efforts of trillions of tiny gas-filled creatures, they are actually enormous organic colonies. Over billions of years, self-organization sets in and the masses of foam become gigantic floating platforms, trailing specialised tendrils that sift food and nutrients from the densely populated atmosphere in method similar to that of the plankton feeders of Earth's oceans. This being the case, cities can become sick (either through accident or at the hands of rebel groups like The Instrumentation) or starve of their own accord—though, like any living system, repair is possible if the issue is caught in time.
- Once the 'cities' have formed slabs, intelligent creatures like the blimps can move in and, through biochemical methods, guide the growth of buildings, roadways (for the symbiauts), and other staple civic structures.
- Blisterponds are the closest that any blimp comes to a permanent residence, and these specialised chambers can be used for short, recuperative rests or for long periods of stasis.

==== Symbiauts / Wheelers ====
- An important part to the functioning of blimp society, the symbiauts are biomechanical creations that are organically constructed by and actually within the blimp body. Blimps evolved this ability after migrating to Jupiter (which they call "Secondhome") where the element-rich atmosphere necessitated the ability to filter and pass metallic waste. While blimps of old used to merely let this waste fall back into the atmosphere, the new society learned over time to guide the construction and programming of basic machines. In time, the art of offcasting (or producing a symbiaut) grew more refined, producing mobile designs with wheels (what the humans would later dub 'Wheelers') and eventually gravity drives (though vestigial wheels remained as a means of energy-conserving locomotion). By Halfholder's time, the symbiauts had become an integral part of both individual and social life.

==== Gravity tech ====
- Through the developments precipitated by symbiaut advances, the blimps were able to remotely construct Diversion Engines inside the moons of Jupiter, which allow them to control the orbits and alignments thereof. There is little explanation of this technology, though the term "repulsion field" is tossed about.

== Role of Jupiter in the Solar System ==
A portion of Wheelers' fiction is based on hypotheses that the presence of gas giants may actually be a necessary factor in the formation of habitable terrestrial planets, as their mass deflects and breaks up potentially devastating threats. Earth-bound comets from outside the Solar System tend to either slingshot past Jupiter and launch into hyperbolic orbits that take them far from the terrestrial planets, or may lose momentum and drift peaceably into the Sun. Without the incredible gravitational presence of Jupiter, it's possible that our planet would experience so many impacts and close calls as to prevent advanced evolution or even the formation of life.

All the same, Jupiter also pulls many objects from the Kuiper belt and Oort cloud, sending them into the inner Solar System.
