= Ian Stewart (mathematician) =

British mathematician and writer (born 1945)

Ian Stewart FRS CMath FIMA
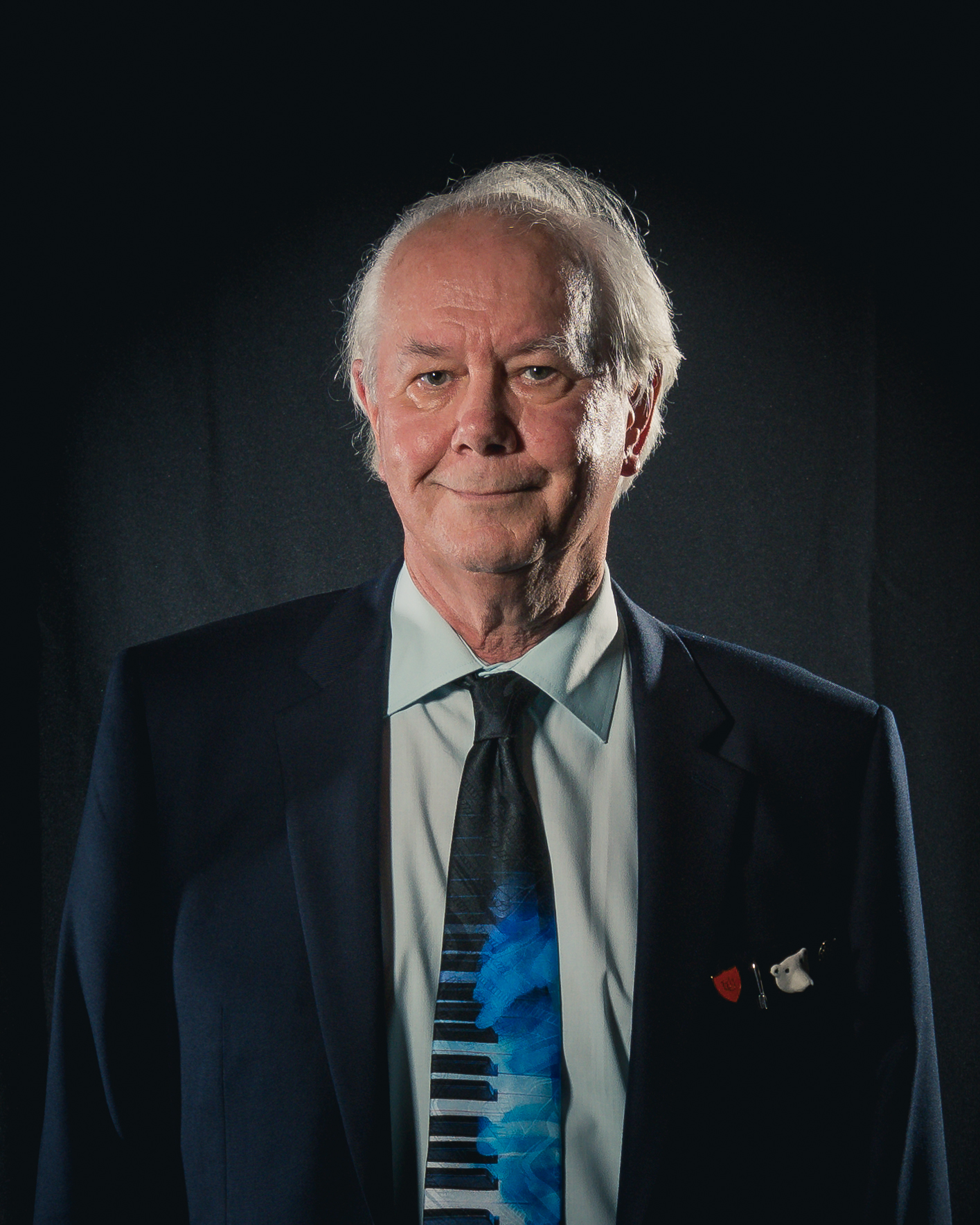
- Stewart in 2017
- Born: Ian Nicholas Stewart; 24 September 1945 (age 80); Folkestone, England
- Education: University of Cambridge (BA); University of Warwick (PhD)
- Known for: Does God Play Dice?; The Science of Discworld
- Awards: Michael Faraday Prize (1995); Royal Institution Christmas Lectures (1997); Christopher Zeeman Medal (2008)
- Scientific career
- Fields: Mathematics
- Workplaces: University of Warwick
- Thesis: Subideals of Lie algebras (1969)
- Doctoral advisor: Brian Hartley
- Website: ianstewartjoat.weebly.com warwick.ac.uk/fac/sci/maths/people/staff/ian_stewart

Ian Nicholas Stewart FRS CMath FIMA (born 24 September 1945) is a British mathematician and a popular-science, textbooks, and science-fiction books writer. He is emeritus professor of mathematics at the University of Warwick, England.

== Education and early life ==
Stewart was born in 1945 in Folkestone, England. While in the sixth form at Harvey Grammar School in Folkestone he came to the attention of the mathematics teacher. The teacher had Stewart sit mock A-level examinations without any preparation along with the upper-sixth students; Stewart was placed first in the examination. He was awarded a scholarship to study at the University of Cambridge as an undergraduate student of Churchill College, Cambridge, where he studied the Mathematical Tripos and obtained a first-class Bachelor of Arts degree in mathematics in 1966. Stewart then went to the University of Warwick where his PhD on Lie algebras was supervised by Brian Hartley and completed in 1969.

== Career and research ==
After his PhD, Stewart was offered an academic position at Warwick. He is well known for his popular expositions of mathematics and his contributions to catastrophe theory.

While at Warwick, Stewart edited the mathematical magazine Manifold. He also wrote a column called "Mathematical Recreations" for Scientific American magazine from 1991 to 2001. This followed the work of past columnists like Martin Gardner, Douglas Hofstadter, and A. K. Dewdney. Altogether, he wrote 96 columns for Scientific American, which were later reprinted in the books "Math Hysteria", "How to Cut a Cake: And Other Mathematical Conundrums" and "Cows in the Maze".

Stewart has held visiting academic positions in Germany (1974), New Zealand (1976), and the US (University of Connecticut 1977–78, University of Houston 1983–84).

Stewart has published more than 140 scientific papers, including a series of influential papers co-authored with Jim Collins coupled oscillators and the symmetry of animal gaits.

Stewart has collaborated with Jack Cohen and Terry Pratchett on four popular science books based on Pratchett's Discworld. In 1999 Terry Pratchett made both Jack Cohen and Stewart "Honorary Wizards of the Unseen University" at the same ceremony at which the University of Warwick gave Terry Pratchett an honorary degree.

In March 2014 Ian Stewart's iPad app, Incredible Numbers by Professor Ian Stewart, launched in the App Store. The app was produced in partnership with Profile Books and Touch Press.

== Publications ==
=== Mathematics and popular science ===
- Manifold, mathematical magazine published at the University of Warwick (1960s)
- Nut-crackers: Puzzles and Games to Boggle the Mind (Piccolo Books) with John Jaworski, 1971. ISBN 978-0-330-02795-3
- Concepts of Modern Mathematics (1975)
- Oh! Catastrophe (1982, in French)
- Does God Play Dice? The New Mathematics of Chaos (1989)
- Game, Set and Math (1991)
- Fearful Symmetry (1992)
- Another Fine Math You've Got Me Into (1992)
- The Collapse of Chaos: Discovering Simplicity in a Complex World, with Jack Cohen (1995)
- Nature's Numbers: The Unreal Reality of Mathematics (1995)
- What is Mathematics? – originally by Richard Courant and Herbert Robbins, second edition revised by Ian Stewart (1996)
- From Here to Infinity (1996), originally published as The Problems of Mathematics (1987)
- Figments of Reality, with Jack Cohen (1997)
- The Magical Maze: Seeing the World Through Mathematical Eyes (1998) ISBN 0-471-35065-6
- Life's Other Secret (1998)
- What Shape is a Snowflake? (2001)
- Flatterland (2001) ISBN 0-7382-0442-0 (See Flatland)
- The Annotated Flatland (2002)
- Evolving the Alien: The Science of Extraterrestrial Life, with Jack Cohen (2002). Second edition published as What Does a Martian Look Like? The Science of Extraterrestrial Life.
- Math Hysteria (2004) ISBN 0-19-861336-9
- The Mayor of Uglyville's Dilemma (2005)
- Letters to a Young Mathematician (2006) ISBN 0-465-08231-9
- How to Cut a Cake: And Other Mathematical Conundrums (2006) ISBN 978-0-19-920590-5
- Why Beauty Is Truth: A History of Symmetry (2007) ISBN 0-465-08236-X
- Taming the infinite: The story of Mathematics from the first numbers to chaos theory (2008) ISBN 978-1-84724-181-8
- Professor Stewart's Cabinet of Mathematical Curiosities (2008) ISBN 1-84668-064-6
- Professor Stewart's Hoard of Mathematical Treasures: Another Drawer from the Cabinet of Curiosities (2009) ISBN 978-1-84668-292-6
- Cows in the Maze: And Other Mathematical Explorations (2010) ISBN 978-0-19-956207-7
- The Mathematics of Life (2011) ISBN 978-0-465-02238-0
- In Pursuit of the Unknown: 17 Equations That Changed the World (2012) ISBN 978-1-84668-531-6
- Symmetry: A Very Short Introduction (2013) ISBN 978-0-19965-198-6
- Visions of Infinity: The Great Mathematical Problems (2013) ISBN 978-0-46502-240-3
- Professor Stewart's Casebook of Mathematical Mysteries (2014) ISBN 978-1-84668-348-0
- Incredible Numbers by Professor Ian Stewart (iPad app) (2014)
- Calculating the Cosmos: How Mathematics Unveils the Universe (2016) ISBN 978-1-78125-718-0
- Infinity: A Very Short Introduction (2017), Oxford University Press.
- Significant Figures: The Lives and Work of Great Mathematicians (2017) ISBN 978-0-465-09612-1
- Do Dice Play God? The Mathematics of Uncertainty (2019), Profile Books.
- What's the use ?: How mathematics shapes everyday life? (2021), Basic Books.
- What's the use ?: The Unreasonable Effectiveness of Mathematics (2021), Profile Books.

=== Computer programming ===
- Easy Programming for the ZX Spectrum (1982), with Robin Jones, Shiva Publishing Ltd., ISBN 978-0-906812-23-5
- Computer Puzzles For Spectrum & ZX81 (1982), with Robin Jones, Shiva Publishing Ltd., ISBN 978-0-906812-27-3
- Timex Sinclair 1000: Programs, Games, and Graphics, with Robin Jones, Birkhäuser, ISBN 978-3-7643-3080-4
- Spectrum Machine Code (1983), with Robin Jones, Shiva Publishing Ltd., ISBN 978-0-906812-35-8
- Further Programming for the ZX Spectrum (1983), with Robin Jones, Shiva Publishing Ltd., ISBN 978-0-906812-24-2
- Gateway to Computing with the ZX Spectrum (1984), Shiva Publishing Ltd., ISBN 978-1-85014-053-5

=== Science of Discworld series ===
- The Science of Discworld, with Jack Cohen and Terry Pratchett
- The Science of Discworld II: The Globe, with Jack Cohen and Terry Pratchett
- The Science of Discworld III: Darwin's Watch, with Jack Cohen and Terry Pratchett
- The Science of Discworld IV: Judgement Day, with Jack Cohen and Terry Pratchett

=== Textbooks ===
- Catastrophe Theory and its Applications, with Tim Poston, Pitman, 1978. ISBN 0-273-01029-8.
- The Foundations of Mathematics, 2nd Edition, Ian Stewart, David Tall. Oxford University Press, 2015. ISBN 978-0-19-870643-4
- Algebraic number theory and Fermat's last theorem, 4th Edition, Ian Stewart, David Tall. Chapman & Hall/CRC, 2015 ISBN 978-1-49-873839-2
- Complex Analysis, 2nd Edition, Ian Stewart, David Tall. Cambridge University Press, 2018. ISBN 978-1-10-843679-3
- Galois Theory, 5th Edition, Chapman & Hall/CRC, 2022 ISBN 978-10-3210159-0 Galois Theory Errata for 3rd Edition

=== Science fiction ===
- Wheelers, with Jack Cohen (fiction)
- Heaven, with Jack Cohen, ISBN 0-446-52983-4, Aspect, May 2004 (fiction)

=== Science and mathematics ===
- Stewart, I. (2007). "Mathematics: Some assembly needed". Nature. 448 (7152): 419. Bibcode:2007Natur.448..419S. doi:10.1038/448419a. PMID 17653179.
- Stewart, I. (2006). "Still light-years away from articulating the infinite". Nature. 441 (7095): 812. Bibcode:2006Natur.441..812S. doi:10.1038/441812e. PMID 16778864.
- Stewart, I. (2005). "Schrödinger's mousetrap". Nature. 433 (7023): 200–201. Bibcode:2005Natur.433..200S. doi:10.1038/433200a. PMID 15662394. S2CID 11917270.
- Stewart, I. (2004). "Nonlinear dynamics: Quantizing the classical cat". Nature. 430 (7001): 731–732. Bibcode:2004Natur.430..731S. doi:10.1038/430731a. PMID 15306790. S2CID 4428580.
- Stewart, I. (2004). "Networking opportunity". Nature. 427 (6975): 601–604. Bibcode:2004Natur.427..601S. doi:10.1038/427601a. PMID 14961110.
- Stewart, I. (2003). "Mathematics: The 24-dimensional greengrocer". Nature. 424 (6951): 895–896. Bibcode:2003Natur.424..895S. doi:10.1038/424895a. PMID 12931173.
- Stewart, I. (2003). "Mathematics: Conjuring with conjectures". Nature. 423 (6936): 124–127. Bibcode:2003Natur.423..124S. doi:10.1038/423124a. PMID 12736663.
- Stewart, I. (2003). "Mathematics: Regime change in meteorology". Nature. 422 (6932): 571–573. Bibcode:2003Natur.422..571S. doi:10.1038/422571a. PMID 12686981.

== Awards and honours ==
In 1995 Stewart received the Michael Faraday Medal and in 1997 he gave the Royal Institution Christmas Lecture on The Magical Maze. He was elected as a Fellow of the Royal Society in 2001. Stewart was the first recipient in 2008 of the Christopher Zeeman Medal, awarded jointly by the London Mathematical Society (LMS) and the Institute of Mathematics and its Applications (IMA) for his work on promoting mathematics.

== Personal life ==
Stewart married Avril, in 1970. They met at a party at a house that Avril was renting while she trained as a nurse. They have two sons. He lists his recreations as science fiction, painting, guitar, keeping fish, geology, Egyptology and snorkelling.
