= Islam in Denmark =

Islam in Europe by percentage of country population 95–100%: Azerbaijan; 90–95%: Turkey; Kosovo; 50–70%: Albania; Bosnia and Herzegovina; Kazakhstan; 30–35%: North Macedonia; 10–20%: France; Sweden; Georgia; Montenegro; 5–10%: Austria; Belgium; Bulgaria; Denmark; Germany; Liechtenstein; Luxembourg; Netherlands; Russia; Switzerland; United Kingdom; Spain; Greece; 4–5%: Serbia; 2–4%: Italy; Finland; Norway; Malta; Slovenia; Cyprus (Note: Only takes into account the Muslim population residing on land controlled by the Republic of Cyprus.); 1–2%: Croatia; Ireland; Ukraine; Andorra; < 1%: Iceland; Armenia; Belarus; Czech Republic; Estonia; Hungary; Latvia; Lithuania; Moldova; Monaco; Poland; Portugal; Romania; San Marino; Slovakia

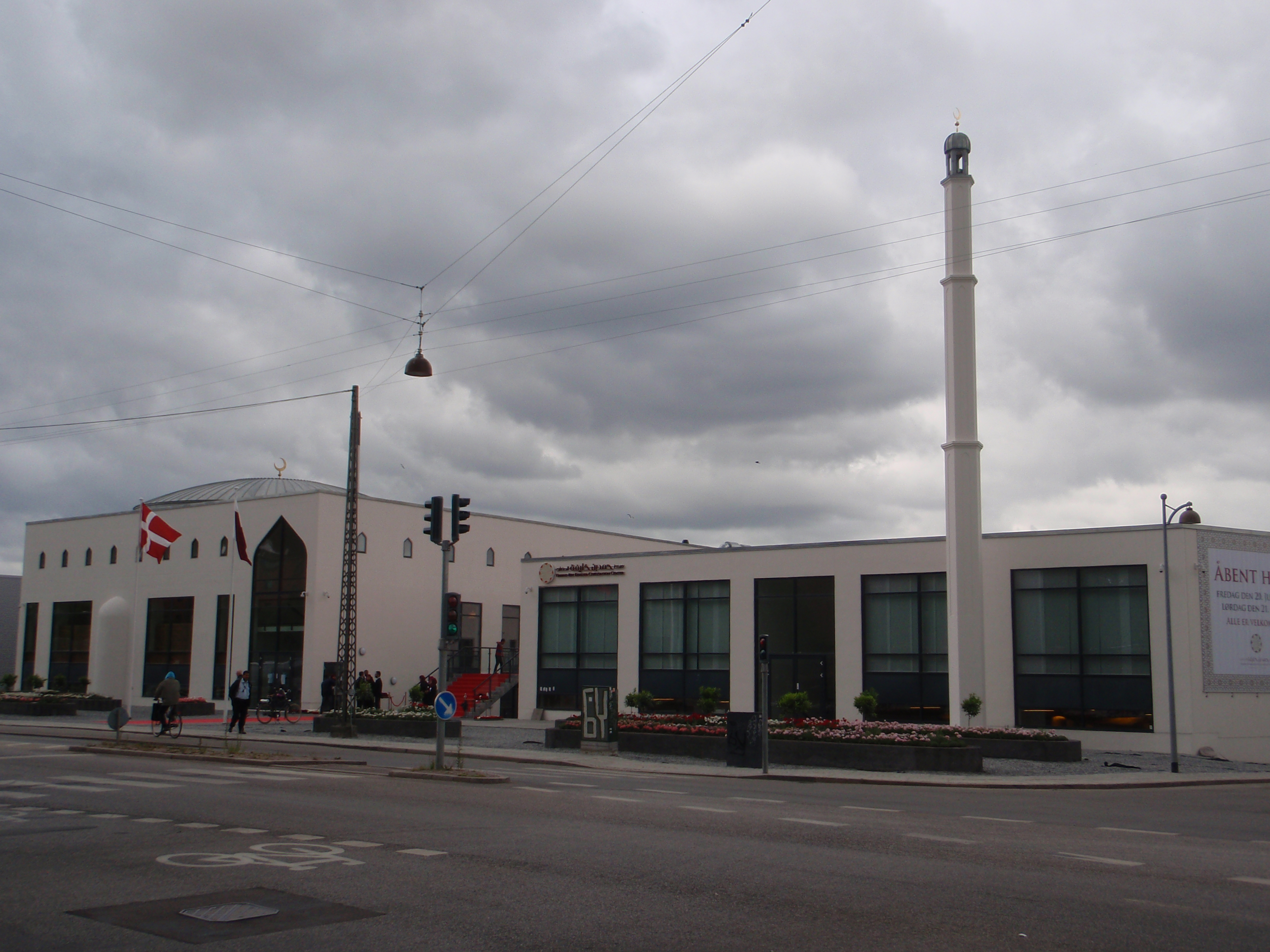
The Grand Mosque of Copenhagen in Copenhagen is one of the largest mosques in Denmark.

Islam in Denmark, being the country's largest minority religion, plays a role in shaping its social and religious landscape. According to a 2020 analysis by Danish researcher Brian Arly Jacobsen, an estimated 256,000 people in Denmark—4.4% of the population—were Muslim in January, 2020. However, according to figures reported by the BBC in 2005, about 4.8% of the Danish population at the time are Muslim (around 270,000 Muslims of 5.6 million). The figure has been increasing for the last several decades due to multiple immigration waves involving economic migrants and asylum seekers. In 1980, an estimated 30,000 Muslims lived in Denmark, amounting to 0.6% of the population.

The majority of Muslims in Denmark are Sunni, with a sizeable Shia minority. Members of the Ahmadiyya community are also present in Denmark. In the 1970s Muslims arrived from Turkey, Pakistan, Morocco and the former Yugoslavia (mainly Bosnia) to work. In the 1980s and 90s the majority of Muslim arrivals were refugees and asylum seekers from Iran, Iraq, Somalia and Bosnia. In addition, some ethnic Danes have converted to Islam; In 2017, close to 3,800 Danish Muslims were converts to the religion. According to a survey by Aarhus University, the number of mosques is on a steady upward trajectory, rising from 115 in 2006 to 161 in 2017 —an increase of 40%.

== History ==
Danish historian Jørgen Bæk Simonsen documents that encounters between Denmark and the Muslim world date back to the Middle Ages, when the Danish military participated in the Crusades to take control of Jerusalem from Muslim rule. King Frederick V of Denmark also travelled to South Arabia to collect information, plants, and artifacts. Among his co-voyagers was Carsten Niebuhr who observed and noted the customs of the region. One of the first Danish converts to Islam was Knud Holmboe, a journalist and writer of Desert Encounter, in which he detailed his first-hand account of the Libyan Genocide.

An 1880 Danish census recorded 8 "Mohammadans" in the country. Censuses continued to be carried out until 1970. Large-scale immigration from Muslim countries began in the 1950s. Due to the expansion of Denmark's post-war economy and increase in industrialization in the 1950-1960s, a large number of immigrants migrated to the country from the highly-Muslim populated nations of Yugoslavia, Turkey, Pakistan, and North Africa. This period was the first wave of large-scale Muslim immigration to Denmark. The first purpose-built mosques belonged to Ahmadi Muslims and was constructed in 1967. In 1973, the Danish government stopped free migration to the country. Rules were laxed in 1974 so that people with family in Denmark, people marrying someone in Denmark, or people seeking asylum could come to the country. In the 1980s, a second wave of Muslims immigrated to Denmark, mainly from Iran, the Middle East, and Africa. Many of these immigrants were seeking political asylum.

Freedom of religion is guaranteed by the Constitution of Denmark, but the Church of Denmark enjoys certain privileges such as state subsidies that other religious groups in the country do not. As of 2013, 23 different Muslim communities are recognized as "acknowledged religious communities", giving them certain tax benefits.

=== 2000s ===
The asylum seekers comprise about 40% of the Danish Muslim population.

According to a survey conducted in the mid-2000s on mosques in Denmark, there were about 115 mosques in Denmark. Of these, about 105 were Sunni Muslim, with most others following the Shia branch. It was found that there were about 30 imams on work visas active in Denmark from abroad and most of these were sent by the Turkish Directorate of Religious Affairs (Diyanet) agency. As a general rule, Friday prayers were not conducted in Danish but in the native tongues of the congregation.

=== 2010s ===
In 2014, halal slaughter without electrical stunning was banned in Denmark, citing animal welfare concerns.

In February 2016, the Mariam mosque in Copenhagen, Denmark's first female-run mosque, was founded by Sherin Khankan; it has only female imams. The mosque is open to male and female worshippers, with the exception of Friday prayers, which are only open to female worshippers. Khankan became Scandinavia's first female imam when she opened that mosque.

In August 2017, two imams, one of which is the head of Hizb ut-Tahrir in Australia, were added to the Danish list of hate preachers, which meant they could not enter Denmark, bringing the total to ten.

In autumn 2017, the Danish parliament (Danish: Folketinget) agreed to adopt a law prohibiting people to wear "attire and clothing masking the face in such a way that it impairs recognizability". A full ban on both niqabs and burqas was announced on 31 May 2018. The ban came into force on 1 August 2018 and carries a fine of 1000 DKK (about 134 euros); with repeat offending, the fine may reach 10 000 DKK. It targets all garments that cover the face, such as fake beards or balaclavas. Supporters of the ban claim that the ban facilitates integration of Muslims into Danish society, while Amnesty International claimed the ban violated women's rights. A protest numbering 300-400 people was held in the Nørrebro district of Copenhagen, organised by the Socialist Youth Front, Kvinder i Dialog and Party Rebels.

According to a 2017 survey, there was an increase in the number of mosques in Denmark from 115 in 2006 to about 170 in 2017, which represented an increase of almost 50%. This increase corresponded roughly to the increasing numbers of Muslims in the country, which had risen from 200,000 to about 300,000.

According to polls among Muslims in Denmark conducted in 2006 and 2018, religiosity shows an escalation over time; whereas 37% prayed five times a day in 2006, by 2018 this number had increased to 50%. This was contrary to expectations that Muslims had been expected to conform to mainstream Danish society, where not many people are not particularly devoted to religion. The possible cause of the trend, according to sociologist Brian Arly Jacobsen at Copenhagen University, was the construction of 20-30 new mosques in the intervening 10 years.

In April 2019, riots broke out in Nørrebro in Copenhagen, Denmark, after Islam critic Rasmus Paludan staged a demonstration in the district. 23 people were arrested for a range of offences, from refusal to obey commands issued by police to arson and violence against police. Emergency services responded to 70 fires connected to the disturbances.

=== 2020s ===
In March 2021, legislation banned antidemocratic donations to recipients in Denmark, which according to Immigration minister Mattias Tesfaye was due to there being extremist movements abroad which are trying to turn Muslims against Denmark and undermining core values of Danish society. The legislation was prompted by media reports of millions being donated to mosques in Denmark having received millions in donations from the Middle East.

== Demographics ==
The Danish government does not collect data on citizens' religion so the exact number of Muslims in Denmark is not known with certainty. The Danish researcher Brian Arly Jacobsen from the University of Copenhagen, who makes regular estimations based on the national origin of immigrants and their descendants, estimates that by January 2020 Muslims made up 256,000 persons or 4.4% of the Danish population. One year earlier, Jacobsen had estimated the number of Danish Muslims to 320,000 persons, but adjusted his earlier estimates downwards after having accessed new and more precise data.

The Danish Muslim population has been increasing for the last several decades. Jacobsen has estimated that in 1980, close to 30,000 Muslims lived in Denmark, i.e. 0.6% of the population. In 2009, the U.S. Department of State reported the share as approximately 3.7% of the population due to immigration. Earlier sources, including the Ministry of Foreign Affairs of Denmark, have cited lower percentages. According to figures reported by the BBC in 2005, about 270,000 Muslims lived in Denmark at the time (4.8% out of a population of 5.6 million).

Over 70% of Muslims in Denmark are Danish citizens, and the majority are first- or second-generation immigrants. In 2017, close to 3,800 Danish Muslims were converts to the religion. Muslims are unevenly distributed around Denmark with the majority concentrated in major cities. An estimated 47.4% of Danish Muslims live in Greater Copenhagen, 9.4% in Aarhus, and 5.5% in Odense.

=== Ethnicity ===
In 2008 a report published by the Danish Broadcasting Corporation estimated that the Danish Turks formed 70,000 out of a total of 200,000 Muslims in the country. Hence, approximately 35% of the country's Muslims were of Turkish origin.

In 2014, Brian Arly Jacobsen said that the largest ethnic group of Muslims in Denmark were Turks (22.2% of all Danish Muslims), followed by Iraqis (10.2%), Lebanese (9.5%), Pakistanis (8.7%), Somalis (7.3%), and Afghans (6.3%).

== Branches ==
According to a 2008 survey of immigrants to Denmark from Muslim-majority countries by IntegrationsStatus, 45% were Sunni, 11% were Shia, and 23% belonged to another branch of Islam (such as Hanafi, Salafi, Shafai Humbli, etc.). The other 21% belonged to another religion or had no religion.

== Religiosity ==
A 2002/2003 study of Danish youth in upper secondary school found that 100% of Muslims believed in God and 90% believed in heaven, hell, angels and devils. Only 52% of non-Muslim Danes in the survey said they believed in God while 15-25% said they believed in heaven, hell, angels and devils. Roughly half of the Muslims in the survey said they prayed often, while a third claimed to visit a mosque once a month. In a 2005 survey, 40% of Muslim immigrants and their descendants participated in religious ceremonies/services compared to 60% of Roman Catholic immigrants/ descendants did the same. In a 2008 survey of immigrants from Turkey, Pakistan, ex-Yugoslavia, Iran, Iraq, and Somalia, 37% considered themselves very little/little religious, 33% considered themselves moderately religious, 24% considered themselves very religious. A 2011 survey found that 37% of Danish Muslims were non-practicing Muslims.

In a 2006 survey, 82% of Danish Muslim parents answered that religion was an important issue in the upbringing of children compared to 67% of Danish non-Muslims who answered the same.

In 2006, Jyllands-Posten conducted a poll which found that 37% of Muslims prayed five times a day or more, in 2015 the figure had risen to just about half, or 50%. In 2006, 62% agreed that the instructions of the Quran should be followed completely, in 2015 the figure had increased to 77%. According to the poll, younger Muslims were the most religious. A researcher at Copenhagen University, Brian Arly Jacobsen, concluded that Muslims were becoming more religious but he also criticized the methodology behind the study and recommended more research. In 2020, a group of former Muslims in Denmark formed a Scandinavian chapter of Central Council of Ex-Muslims, an organization which started in Germany where people who had left the religion could support each other.

A 2017 Fundamental Rights Agency report found that on a scale from 1 (not at all attached) to 5 (very strongly attached), the average Danish Muslim felt a 3.9.

== Culture ==
Roughly 3,000 Shia Muslims march annually in Nørrebro during Ashura. Since 2011, Muslim organizations such as the Danish Muslim Union and Minhaj-ul-Qur'an have held a "Peace March" to celebrate Mawlid with hundreds in attendance.

In September 2017, the Danish bureau Unique Models became the first and only fashion agency in the country to include a Muslim woman who wears a hijab when they hired the 21-year-old Amina Adan.

=== Interfaith relations ===
Several Muslim youth organizations work to make contact with Danish society as a whole by inviting locals to mosques and representing Islam in a positive light. In 1996, the Islamic-Christian Study Centre was set up by Muslims and Christians. It has an equal number of Muslims and Christians as board members and strives to build positive relations between citizens of both religions. The members focus on counselling, lectures, study groups, excursions, and publications. A report titled Conversation Promotes Understanding published by the Church of Denmark in 2000 put an emphasis on increasing dialogue with Muslims. Margrethe Vestager, the then Minister for Ecclesiastical Affairs, supported the conclusion of the report. The Church of Denmark has held friendship dinners for Muslims during Ramadan and Christmas.

== Education ==
Annette H. Ihle's 2007 study of Muslim School (also called Free Schools) have a higher rate of students continuing into high school than national public schools (41% to 26%). A more recent 2016 analysis by the politically independent think-tank Kraka concluded that students with a non-western background attending Muslim private schools achieved significantly better grades in their 9th grade exit examinations than their Muslim counterparts at Danish public schools. The difference between the students' final examination marks was 1.4 grade points–an average 4.6 at the public schools and 6.0 at the Muslim private schools.

== Religious issues ==
In 1967 the Nusrat Jahan Mosque was built in Hvidovre, a Copenhagen suburb. This mosque is used by adherents of the Ahmadiyya faith.

Other mosques exist but are not built for the explicit purpose. It is not forbidden to build mosques or any other religious buildings in Denmark but there are very strict zoning laws. One piece of land has been reserved for a grand mosque at Amager (near Copenhagen), but financing is not settled. Danish Muslims have not succeeded in cooperating on the financing of the project and do not agree on whether it should be financed with outside sources, such as Saudi money. Advertisements by the Danish People's Party, which promote anti-mosque legislation, contend that Iran and Saudi Arabia are sources of funding. These are considered despotic regimes by the DPP.

Seven Danish cemeteries have separate sections for Muslims. Most of the Danish Muslims are buried in those cemeteries, with about 70 being flown abroad for burial in their countries of origin. A separate Muslim cemetery was opened in Brøndby near Copenhagen in September 2006.

In 2009, the U.S. Department of State released a report on religious freedom in Denmark. One finding was that there were a few isolated incidents of discrimination against immigrants, which included desecration of graves:

There were isolated incidents of anti-immigrant sentiment, including graffiti, low-level assaults, denial of service, and employment discrimination on racial grounds. Societal discrimination against religious minorities was difficult to distinguish from discrimination against ethnic minorities. The Government criticized the incidents and investigated several, but it brought few cases to trial specifically on charges of racial discrimination or hate crimes. Reports continued of incidents of desecration of ethnic and religious minority gravesites.

=== Al-Faruq mosque ===
In May 2017 an imam of the al-Faruq mosque in Nørrebro held a service where he preached a vision of the caliphate and the murder of Jews. The sermon was uploaded to YouTube and after having been translated, it was reported to police as a hate crime. The trial began in July 2018. In a Facebook post, the imam claimed that the Denmark had criminalised the words of his prophet and the word of his deity. The al-Faruq mosque also appeared in the 2015 Copenhagen terrorist attack as perpetrator Omar el-Hussein had visited there. When TV2 reporters visited the mosque for two hours, they did not find any visitors who rejected the views of the imam.

=== Grimhøj mosque ===
In 2014, regional police authorities (Danish: Østjyllands Politi) found that of the 27 individuals who had travelled from the Gellerup area to participate in the war in Syria and Iraq, 22 had been visitors to Grimhøj mosque. The former chairman of the mosque Oussama El-Saadi was interviewed in a 2014 DR documentary about the mosque where he expressed sympathies for the Islamic State of Iraq and the Levant. In 2016 journalists visited the Grimhøj mosque with a hidden camera and imam Abu Bilal preached that women who were unfaithful to their husbands should be stoned to death or whipped and infidels (who did not take part in Ramadan fasting) should be killed.

== Politics ==
As of 1989, Denmark has allowed all immigrants who have a three-year legal stay, to vote and compete in local elections. However, only Danish citizens may vote for members of the National Parliament.

In 2007, a hijab-wearing Muslim woman named Asmaa Abdol-Hamid attempted to run for Folketing, gaining the candidacy for a Copenhagen seat for the Red-Green Alliance. She was listed seventh on the party's parliamentary candidate list. Her candidacy caused debate in Denmark over the fact that she intended to serve wearing a hijab. Although she was not elected, it was said that she might still appear in the parliament as a substitute for Johanne Schmidt-Nielsen. Danish People's Party MP Søren Krarup compared Abdol-Hamid's headscarf to a Nazi swastika, saying they were both symbols of totalitarianism. Anthropologist Mikkel Rytter stated that there is a "'litmus-test' of Muslim politicians" regarding whether a practicing Muslim could be trusted to protect human rights and separation of church and state in government.

In 2014, three Muslim brothers formed the National Party to focus on what they saw as an attack on traditional Danish values of tolerance and openness. The political party focuses on anti-racism and allowing public expression of religion.

=== Sharia law ===
According to a poll by the Wilke institute, almost 40% of Muslims agreed that Danish law should be based on the Quran, of which 11.3% of agreed that Danish law should be exclusively based on the Quran and the other 26.5% agreed that Danish law should be based on a mix of the Quran and the Constitution of Denmark.

=== Freedom of speech ===
A poll by the Danish Ministry of Justice in 2020 showed that 76% of Muslim immigrants and their descendants from Turkey, Lebanon, Pakistan and Somalia agreed that criticising Islam should be outlawed, compared to 18% of the total population. The Danish law against blasphemy was abolished in 2017. In December 2023, the Danish Parliament adopted a bill prohibiting public burnings of the Quran.

== Religious infrastructure ==
A 2006 report estimated that 20% to 25% of Danish Muslims were associated with a mosque association. Sociologist of religion, Lene Kühle, estimated in 2006 that there were 115 mosques in Denmark. Of these, 11 were Shia, and 2 were Ahmadi.

=== Schools ===
In Denmark, religious studies is named "Christian studies" and focuses on the Church of Denmark. Parents have the right to withdraw their students from these religious courses but Muslim parents rarely do. Students in grades 1-6 learn about the Church of Denmark, before the curriculum begins teaching major world religions, including Islam, in grades 7–9. As a result, all students in Denmark receive a basic understanding of Islamic beliefs and culture.

The first Muslim private school was founded in 1978 and called the Islamic Arabic School (Danish: Islamisk Arabiske Skole) in Helsingør. Since then, over 30 such schools have been opened and many offer Arabic language classes and Islamic studies. However, the majority of Muslim students still go to non-religious public schools.

The biggest school is Dia Privatskole in Nørrebro with about 410 students. Two Pakistani schools teach in Urdu as mother tongue and several Turkish schools have Turkish instruction. Most other schools cater to Arabic-speaking students.

In July 2017 study material in Arabic which promoted martyrdom and jihadism was found in the Islamic school Nordvest Privatskole (tr: Northwest Private School) in Copenhagen during an unannounced visit by Danish education authorities. The school's building was sold in June 2017 to the investor Ali Laibi Jabbar from shia Almuntadar congregation in Malmö. Danish school inspection did not believe the principal of Nordvest when he claimed the investor would have no influence in how the school is run and stopped state funding of the school.

In Iqra Privatskole in Copenhagen immigrant-dominated district of Nørrebro it was discovered that vice principal and imam Shahid Mehdi for years had run a web page where he discouraged Muslim youth from having non-Muslim friends. Shahid Mehdi was sentenced in Malmö for having sexually assaulted a woman in a park by baring his genitals and chasing her. As a result of these investigations, the school was placed under stricter supervision by authorities.

The Roser Skolen in Odense was placed under supervision by authorities investigating whether controversial imam Abu Bashar from Vollsmose was running the school as a front, after it was discovered his 28-year-old son was hired in a managerial position at the school.

In the Al-Salam school in Odense authorities investigated whether the principal spoke Danish and whether the teaching was primarily done in Arabic.

In the summer of 2018, the Muslim school Lykkeskolen in Aarhus was closed. The public school which received the pupils found that several of them could not read and their education had to start from the beginning. The receiving school also noted that fights among the pupils became frequent which had only occurred rarely before.

=== Organizations ===
- Islam i Danmark (Islam in Denmark [acronym, 'IslamDK']), founded in 2007, based in Copenhagen.
- Foreningen af Demokratiske Muslimer (The organization of democratic Muslims), founded by Naser Khader in 2006. Its current chairman is Moustapha Kassem.
- Islamisk Trossamfund, Sunni Muslim, with strong Salafi tendencies, run by Mostafa Chendid, a Moroccan-born Danish imam.
- Muslimer i Dialog (Muslims in Dialogue), largely Sunni, run by Noman Malik and Abdul Wahid Pedersen. Their spokesman is Zubair Butt Hussain.
- Hizb ut-Tahrir, mainly Sunni. (50-500 members)
- Foreningen Salam (Salam Association) is run by Shia Muslim women.
- UngeMuslimer Gruppen, (Young Muslims Group), Shia Muslim, based in Copenhagen.
- Ahmadiyya Muslim Community Denmark, part of the Ahmadiyya movement
- Wilayah Organisationen, (Wilayah Organization), Shia Muslim, based in Copenhagen.

== Controversy ==
=== Islamic dress ===
In 2005, the Supreme Court of Denmark upheld a law allowing businesses to ban women from wearing headscarves as part of a uniform. In 2009, judges and jurors were banned from wearing any religious symbols, including headscarves. The law was met with opposition by several bar associations. Some schools have banned face veils in class. The Danish People's Party has called for a ban on face veils nationwide, as well as a ban on headscarves in parliament, but neither of these proposals have passed as of 2013.

In May 2018, Parliament officially passed a law banning the wear of any garment that covers the face, effectively prohibiting burqas and niqabs. Politicians who support this law argue that it is a matter of national security, while opponents of the law argue that it is a means of discriminating against Muslim women. Justice Minister Soren Pape Poulsen defended the law, arguing that the Muslim dress violated Danish values. Following the passing of the law, a number of protests were held across the nation. The group Kvinder i Dialog held peaceful demonstrations in Copenhagen against the law.

In August 2022, a commission appointed by the government was met with backlash after it proposed a ban on hijabs in schools.

=== Jyllands-Posten Muhammad cartoons controversy ===
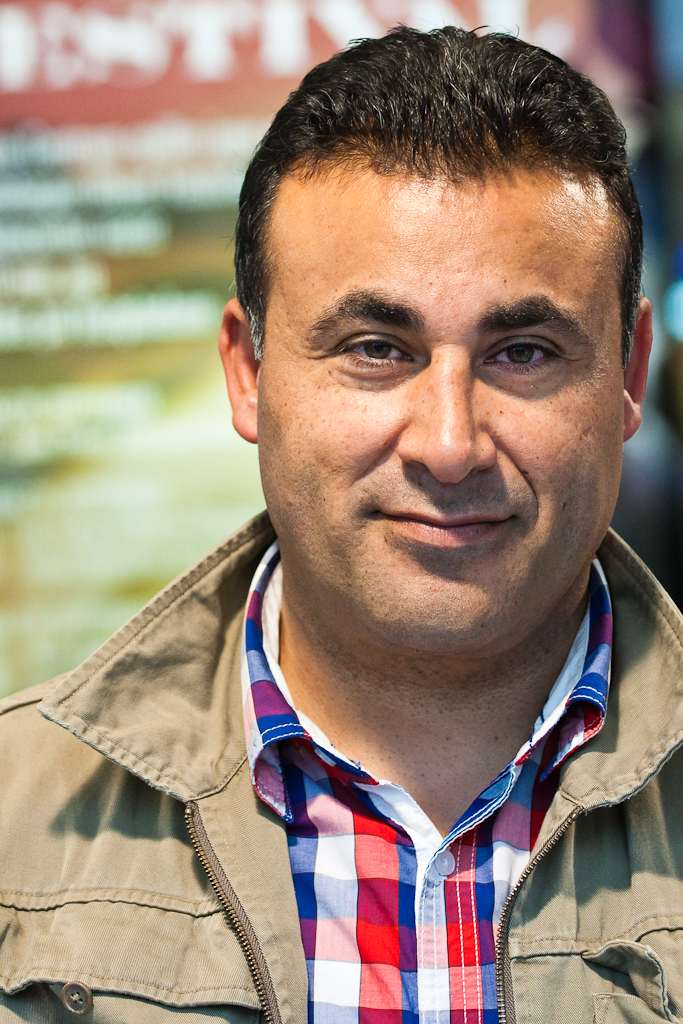
Naser Khader, one of the founders of Democratic Muslims

The Danish newspaper Jyllands-Posten printed 12 caricatures of the Islamic prophet Muhammad in September 2005. These cartoons sparked an international controversy, ultimately resulting in the scorching of two Danish diplomatic missions, a boycott of Danish goods in several countries, and a large number of protests around the world. The number of protests caused an increase in support for the anti-immigration Danish People's Party.

In February 2006 after the escalation of the cartoons controversy the political organization Democratic Muslims (Danish: Demokratiske muslimer) was founded by Naser Khader, Yildiz Akdogan and other Muslims. Its goal is a peaceful co-existence of Islam and democracy. Naser Khader left his position as leader in 2007. In 2009 and 2011, it was reported that the organization had few members and little activity.

In August 2013 Ahmed Akkari, who had taken a major role in the affair and was the spokesman for a tour of Imams to the Middle East to protest the cartoons, expressed his regret for his role in the Imams' tour of the Middle East, stating that "I want to be clear today about the trip: It was totally wrong. At that time, I was so fascinated with this logical force in the Islamic mindset that I could not see the greater picture. I was convinced it was a fight for my faith, Islam." Still a practising Muslim, he said that printing the cartoons was ok and he personally apologised to the cartoonist Westergaard. Westergaard responded by saying "I met a man who has converted from being an Islamist to become a humanist who understands the values of our society. To me, he is really sincere, convincing and strong in his views." A spokesman for the Islamic Society of Denmark said "It is still not OK to publish drawings of Muhammad. We have not changed our position."

=== Citizenship Laws ===
In 2018, the Danish nationality law was changed to make a handshake a mandatory component of the nationalization ceremony by ruling right-wing coalition. As some Muslims along with some Jewish groups oppose physical contact with members of the opposite sex, many individuals argue that this law targets Muslim immigrants. Proponents of this law argue that the handshake is a sign of respect towards Danish culture and values. The law was criticised by several left-wing politicians. Kasper Ejsing Olesen called the law "absurd." Søren Søndergaard said "it's hypocrisy" and stated "we do not ensure how people behave with a handshake."

=== Islamism and terrorism ===
The Islamist movements gradually grew since the 1990s. The first Islamist groups and networks were predominantly influenced by the countries they immigrated from. Those involved had close contact with militant Islamists in the Middle East, South Asia and North Africa. Their operations had supporting militant groups financially as their first priority. Since the 1990s, people from the Islamist movements joined several conflicts to train with or participate in fighting with Islamist militants.

In the 2000s the Islamist movements grew and by 2014 there were militants among the Islamist movements in Copenhagen, Aarhus and Odense. Several people from crime gangs join Islamist movements that sympathise with militant Islamism. The militant Islamist movement were estimated to encompass some hundreds in 2014.

The Danish National Centre for Social Research released a report commissioned by the Ministry of Children, Integration and Social Affairs documenting 15 extremist groups operating in Denmark. Most were non-Muslim far-right or far-left groups, but five were Sunni Islamist groups. These Sunni Islamist groups include Hizb ut-Tahrir Denmark, Dawah-bærere (Dawah Carriers), Kaldet til Islam (The Call to Islam), Dawah-centret (The Dawah Centre), and the Muslimsk Ungdomscenter (The Muslim Youth Centre). All of these Sunni Islamist groups operate in Greater Copenhagen with the exception of Muslimsk Ungdomscenter, which operates in Aarhus. Altogether, roughly 195 to 415 Muslims belong to one of these organizations and most are young men.

==== Islamist Foreign fighters from Denmark ====
According to the Danish Security and Intelligence Service (PET), c. 125 people have left the country since 2011 to travel to the Syria/Iraq war zone where the majority joined the Islamic State. As of April 2016, 27 of those who went are confirmed to have died and some deaths were due to participating in suicide attacks. A minority of those who went to groups who opposed Islamist organizations. The majority of those who joined the conflict were young Sunni Muslims of whom some were converts. Those who went were part of the Islamist scenes in Copenhagen, Aarhus and Odense. Of the 22 who travelled from Aarhus, all came from the Grimhøj mosque.

In 2019–2020, the government of Denmark changed the law so that dual citizens fighting for the Islamic State more easily can lose their Danish citizenship, and children born in the conflict zone to Danish dual citizens or where only one parent is a Danish citizen will no longer automatically receive Danish citizenship.

==== Incidents and plots ====
Date	Type	Dead	Injured	Location and description
2007, 2014	inciting terrorism	0	0	In 2007, Morocco-born Said Mansour was the first to be charged with the offence of inciting terrorism. In 2014, he was sentenced again by the Frederiksberg court to four years in jail for publishing extremist Islamist material thereby supporting al-Qaeda. In 2015 the Østre Landsret upholds the sentenced and strips Mansour of his Danish citizenship and issues a deportation order. In June 2016, the supreme court upholds the deportation order. After the supreme court decision, Danish authorities negoatiated with Morocco on a repatriation treaty. He was deported in January 2019.
29 December 2010	Shooting plot	0	0	2010 Copenhagen terror plot - Security services in Denmark and Sweden thwarted a terrorist plot against Jyllands-Posten, the publisher of the controversial cartoons of Muhammad in 2005. In several raids they detained five men, who were described as militant Islamists. Automatic weapons, together with ammunition and silencers, were seized by the police.
Early 2015	Bomb plot	0	0	2015 Kundby bomb plot - A 17-year-old girl was attempting to attack against a school in Fårevejle Stationsby and a private Jewish school in Copenhagen, scheduled to take place in early 2016, using home-made bombs. In May 2017, she was found guilty in the district court (Danish: byret) of Holbæk and was sentenced to six years in jail. She appealed the verdict and wanted to be acquitted of the charges. She was again tried by the Østre Landsret which found her guilty of terrorism with jihadist motive.
14 February 2015	Shooting	2 (+1 perp.)	5	2015 Copenhagen shootings - 2 days of shooting attacks in Copenhagen beginning at a public event called "Art, Blasphemy and Freedom of Expression" at Krudttønden cultural centre. Two victims and the suspected perpetrator were killed, while five police officers were wounded.

== Discrimination ==
A 2008 study by Brian Arly Jacobsen compared parliamentary debates over Islam from 1967 to 2005 to parliamentary debates of Jewish immigrants from 1903 to 1925. The study concluded that while both minority groups have been seen as alien, Jews were often seen as biologically and racially different whereas Muslims are seen having a culture incompatible with Danish society.

In 2015, about 200 Danes in Copenhagen wielding torches and placards marched in Denmark's first anti-Islam PEGIDA rally. The protesters marched from the National Art Museum to The Little Mermaid, and were opposed along the way in Nørrebro by anti-racist counter-demonstrators holding signs reading "Refugees and Muslims are welcome." Some Muslims attended a counter-protest nearby and despite confrontations with PEGIDA supporters no violence ensued.

According to a report by the Danish National Police in 2017, 67 religiously motivated hate crimes were reported against Muslims in the country, showing a significant increase from previous years. This increase in anti-Muslim discrimination follows a similar pattern as that of France, Sweden, and other surrounding European nations.

== Noted Danish Muslims ==
- Ahmad Abu Laban
- Ahmed Akkari
- Asmaa Abdol-Hamid
- Dar Salim
- Knud Holmboe
- Abdul Wahid Pedersen
- Saliha Marie Fetteh
- Isam Bachiri
- Omar Marzouk
- Özlem Cekic

== See also ==
- Ahmadiyya in Denmark
- Arabs in Denmark
  - Iraqis in Denmark
  - Lebanese people in Denmark
  - Moroccans in Denmark
  - Syrians in Denmark
- Iranians in Denmark
- Pakistanis in Denmark
- Religion in Denmark
- Somalis in Denmark
- Turks in Denmark

== Sources ==
- Cesari, Jocelyne (2014). The Oxford Handbook of European Islam. Oxford University Press. ISBN 9780199607976.
- Jacobsen, Brian Arly (31 October 2014). "Denmark". In Nielsen, Jørgen; Akgönül, Samim; Alibašić, Ahmet; Racius, Egdunas (eds.). Yearbook of Muslims in Europe, Volume 6. BRILL. ISBN 9789004283053.
- Jacobsen, Brian Arly (30 October 2015). "Denmark". In Scharbrodt, Oliver; Akgönül, Samim; Alibašić, Ahmet; Nielsen, Jørgen; Racius, Egdunas (eds.). Yearbook of Muslims in Europe, Volume 7. BRILL. ISBN 9789004308909.
- Larsson, Göran (2009). Islam in the Nordic and Baltic Countries. Routledge. ISBN 9781134012923.
- Stahnke, Tad; LeGendre, Paul; Grekov, Innokenty; McClintock, Michael (2008), "Violence Against Muslims: 2008 Hate Crime Survey" (PDF), Human Rights First, New York City, United States, archived from the original (PDF) on 8 May 2016
- Kühle, Lene (5 April 2021). "Mosque is for All: Waqf as an Emerging Structure of Islamic Institutionalization in Denmark". NAVEIÑ REET: Nordic Journal of Law and Social Research (10): 21–40. doi:10.7146/nnjlsr.v1i10.125689. ISSN 2246-7807.
