= Liberal and progressive Islam in Europe =

Overview article

This is a list of individual liberal and progressive Islamic movements in Europe, sorted by country. See also Islam in Europe and Euroislam.

== Denmark ==
=== Democratic Muslims ===
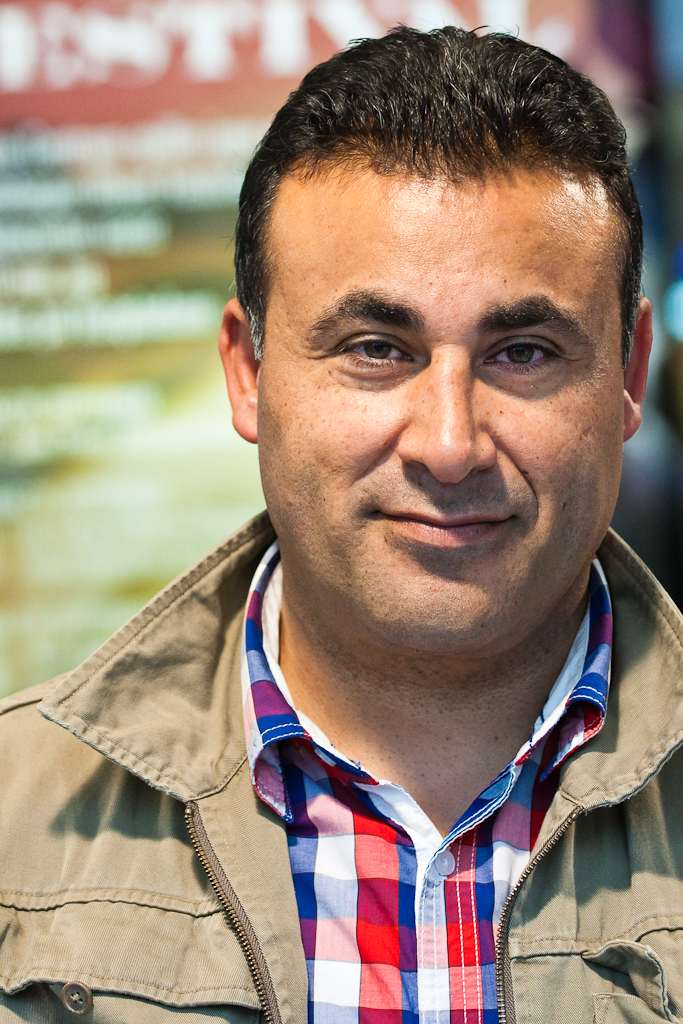
Naser Khader, one of the founders of Democratic Muslims

Democratic Muslims is a political organization in Denmark founded by Naser Khader, Yildiz Akdogan and other Muslims in February 2006 after the escalation of the Jyllands-Posten Muhammad cartoons controversy. Its goal is a peaceful co-existence of Islam and democracy. Naser Khader left his position as leader in 2007. In 2009 and 2011, it was reported that the organization had few members and little activity.

== Germany ==
In June 2017, Seyran Ateş (an attorney, author and human rights activist) opened the Ibn Ruschd-Goethe mosque in Berlin in which worshippers of all Islamic sects and homosexuals were welcome to worship. Men and women pray together unlike in other mosques while face-covering veils such as burqas and niqab were banned on the premises as such garments are by Ateş considered political statements rather than religious clothing. This caused outrage in the Muslim world and the founder of the mosque received hundreds of death threats from Muslims across the world. The legal department of Al-Azhar University in Egypt issued a fatwa against the mosque along with all other liberal mosques.

== Russia ==
=== Jadid ===
The Jadids were Muslim modernist reformers within the Russian Empire in the late 19th and early 20th century. They normally referred to themselves by the Turkic terms Taraqqiparvarlar ('progressives'), Ziyalilar ('intellectuals'), or simply Yäşlär/Yoshlar ('youth'). Jadids maintained that Muslims in the Russian Empire had entered a period of decay that could only be rectified by the acquisition of a new kind of knowledge and modernist, European-modeled cultural reform. Although there were substantial ideological differences within the movement, Jadids were marked by their widespread use of print media in promoting their messages and advocacy of the usul ul-jadid or "new method" of teaching in the maktabs of the empire, from which the term Jadidism is derived. A leading figure in the efforts to reform education was the Crimean Tatar Ismail Gasprinski who lived from 1851–1914. Intellectuals such as Mahmud Khoja (author of the famous play "The Patricide" and founder of one of Turkestan's first Jadid schools) carried Gaspirali's ideas back to Central Asia.

== Sweden ==
=== Young People Against Anti-Semitism and Xenophobia ===
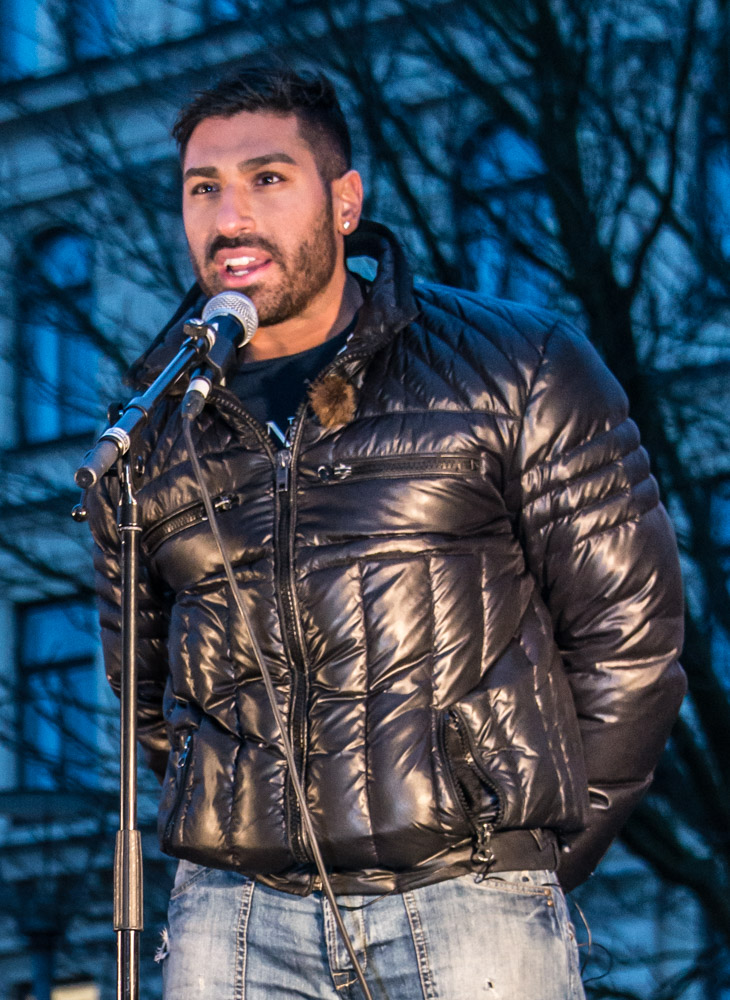
I wanted to build bridges between Jews and Muslims in Malmö because antisemitism is a problem in the city. After that I realised how great the need was to talk about this. Now I work to combat all kinds of xenophobia. — Siavosh Derakhti

Siavosh Derakhti (born July 3, 1991) is a Swedish social activist, founder of Young People Against Anti-Semitism and Xenophobia. In recognition of his activism to reduce antisemitism and xenophobia, the government of Sweden presented him in 2013 with the Raoul Wallenberg Award. The selection committee said Derakhti set a "positive example" in his hometown of Malmö and throughout Sweden. "He is a role model for others," the Wallenberg Award committee wrote, "showing through his actions and determination that one person can make a difference."

== United Kingdom ==
=== Progressive British Muslims ===
Progressive British Muslims (PBM) was a group of Liberal British Muslims that formed following the London terrorist attacks of July 7, 2005. The organisation was founded and chaired by Farmida Bi, an expert in Islamic Finance to provide a voice for progressive Muslims who she felt were unrepresented by existing faith organisations. Its politics promoted collaboration between Muslim and non-Muslim cultures in Britain. As of March 2012, the organization appeared to be defunct.

=== British Muslims for Secular Democracy ===
Founded in 2006, British Muslims for Secular Democracy is a not-for-profit organisation dedicated to supporting secularism in the United Kingdom. It was founded in 2006 by Nasreen Rehman and Yasmin Alibhai-Brown. The group believes the diversity of views among British Muslims is not adequately represented to wider British society and that their image is distorted. The organization is one of the growing number of feminist and progressive Muslim organizations.

=== Quilliam ===
Quilliam was a London-based left-of-center think tank founded in 2008, focusing on counter-extremism, specifically against Islamism, which it argued represents a desire to impose a given interpretation of Islam on society. Founded as The Quilliam Foundation, it lobbies government and public institutions for more nuanced policies regarding Islam and on the need for greater democracy in the Muslim world whilst empowering moderate Muslim voices. The organisation was named after Englishman Abdullah Quilliam, a 19th-century convert to Islam. It dissolved in 2021.

According to one of its co-founders, Maajid Nawaz, "We wish to raise awareness around Islamism"; he also said, "I want to demonstrate how the Islamist ideology is incompatible with Islam. Secondly … develop a Western Islam that is at home in Britain and in Europe … reverse radicalisation by taking on their arguments and countering them."

The organisation opposed any Islamist ideology and championed freedom of expression. The critique of Islamist ideology by its founders, Maajid Usman Nawaz, Rashad Zaman Ali and Ed Husain, is based, in part, on their personal experiences.

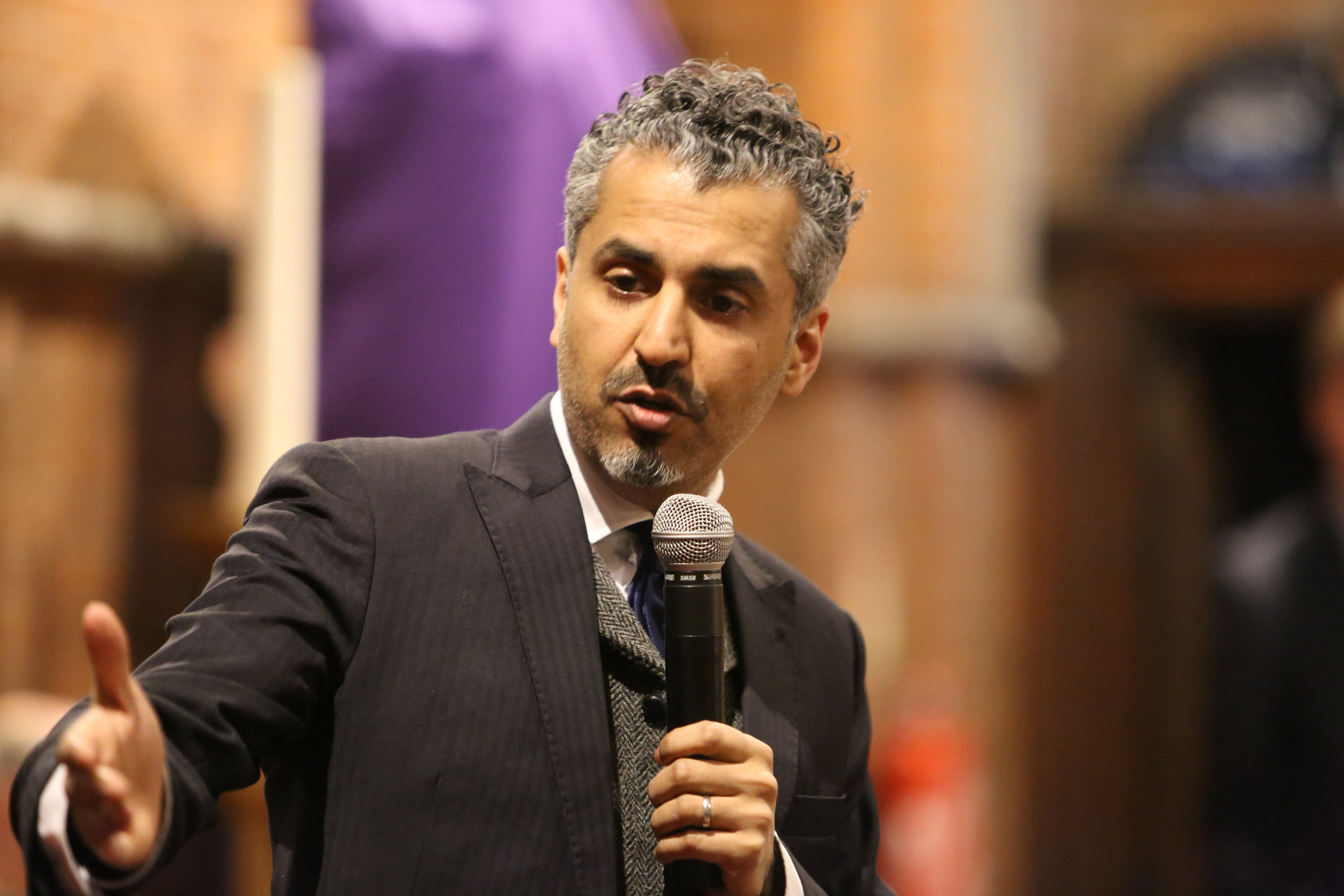
Maajid Nawaz at West Hampstead, London hustings 2015

Co-founder Maajid Nawaz is a British activist, author, columnist, radio host and politician. He was the Liberal Democrat parliamentary candidate for London's Hampstead and Kilburn constituency in the 2015 general election. Nawaz is a former member of the Islamist group Hizb ut-Tahrir. This association led to his arrest in Egypt in December 2001, where he remained imprisoned until 2006. Reading books on human rights and interacting with Amnesty International, which adopted him as a prisoner of conscience, resulted in a change of heart. This led Nawaz to leave Hizb-ut-Tahrir in 2007, renounce his Islamist past and call for a "Secular Islam". He wrote an autobiography, Radical, which was published in 2012. Since then, he has become a prominent critic of Islamism in the United Kingdom. He is a regular op-ed contributor, debater and public commenter. He presented his views on radicalisation in front of US Senate Committee and UK Home Affairs Committee in their respective inquiries on the roots of radical extremism. His writings have been published in various international newspapers and has delivered lectures at LSE and University of Liverpool, and has given talks at UK Defence Academy and Marshall Center for Security Studies.

Nawaz argues that society must build a competing brand by adhering to its own values and visibly distinguishing its actions from those of the extremists. He warned against the illiberal approach of seeking new powers to intercept communications, or banning non-violent groups, and asserted that liberalism will kill totalitarianism softly, not by mimicking it. He advocates a civil society push back against extremism, just like it was done against racism and homophobia, by seeding grass-roots initiatives and making extremist narratives a taboo. In Nawaz's view, society is moving from an era of Nation-States and Globalisation, where identity is defined by national allegiances and citizenship, to an "Age of Behaviour" where behaviour is shaped by transnational ideas, narratives and allegiances.

Nawaz notes how all transnational social movements of today, whether European Neo-fascism or Islamism, are extremist in nature, and democracy aspirants all over the world are left behind. He criticises the idea of political correctness, and the hesitation of democrats in asserting the universality of democratic norms. He also points to the political failure of many states in the Muslim world as a contributing factor. According to him, there is absence of democratic choice in many Muslim-majority countries, which means that their democratic parties often find themselves competing with non-democratic parties, including theocratic and military-backed ones. The political failure of democratic parties is taken as a failure of democracy itself in the Muslim world.

According to Nawaz, all social movements are made up of some basic elements, and to challenge any movement, its elements have to be replaced with better alternatives. The four elements are:

- Ideas: Idea is the cause in which one believes e.g. the establishment of a global caliphate.
- Narratives: Narrative is the propaganda technique employed to sell that idea e.g. the narrative of West being at war with Islam.
- Symbols: Symbols denote iconography, flags, the logos, attires, congregations etc.
- Leaders: Leaders are the people that come to symbolise what the struggle means.

As a solution, Nawaz suggests building of global youth-led democratic movements that are above politics, and that build demand for democracy at the civilisational level. He notes that while Islamists offer a full package to the Muslim youth, the democrats of the Muslim world offer nothing: there is nothing to dream, no democratic leaders to follow and no democratic symbolism to admire. He cites Malala Yousafzai as a successful symbol of democracy and women's rights, but stresses the need for more such symbols which young Muslims can look up to.

In his essay On Blasphemy, Nawaz notes that all prophets and reformers blasphemed against the existing orders of their time, and that heresy is the only guarantee of progress. He lamented the revival of the atmosphere of blasphemy, and the neo-orientalist unwillingness to defend the ideals of free speech. He also criticised the term Islamophobia which, according to him, is a muzzle on free speech and deployed as a shield against genuine criticism.

=== Inclusive Mosque Initiative ===
The Inclusive Mosque Initiative (commonly known as IMI) was founded in 2012, in London, UK. It is a grassroots activist organization which works toward "Establishing a place of worship for the promotion and practice of an inclusive Islam." Since its inception the organisation has spread rapidly, with chapters across the UK and IMI internationally (Malaysia, Kashmir, Pakistan and Zurich). The London group remains the most active of IMI sites, and is structured around a majlis or committee of volunteers who share the everyday running of the organisation. The beginning of IMI came out of their frustrations with the situation for women in many British mosques, where often women's sections do not exist and "[s]ometimes the facilities for women are very inferior, cramped, and not at all conducive to the attitude of worship."

Relatedly, and thematically linking both the above channels of influence is the work of progressive, feminist and liberationist scholars rereading primarily Islamic sources in practice-based ways, such as Wadud's canonical work and activist endeavours on gender equality, and Asra Nomani's "Islamic Bill of Rights for Women". IMI provides a space where families can pray together and at times are led by women. In all circumstances, regardless of the madhab of salah or who's leading, there is no compulsion for attendants to join in salah.

Inclusive Mosque Initiative is intentionally inclusive and welcomes everyone who is interested in its activities. Whilst IMI is not a specifically queer organisation, amongst its social justice campaigns, IMI is openly concerned with the rights and safety of the LGBT community, Imi also works with, and follows, guidance of progressive, liberationist readings of Islam, and welcomes everyone regardless of gender or sexual identities.

== See also ==
- Liberal and progressive Islam in North America
