= PBM =

PBM may refer to:

== Organizations ==
- Parti Bangsa Malaysia, a registered political party in Malaysia
- Progressive British Muslims, former religious organisation in the United Kingdom

== Transport ==
- Johan Adolf Pengel International Airport, Paramaribo, Suriname, IATA code
- PBM Mariner, a flying boat
- Paul Bird Motorsport, UK

== Other ==
- Portable bitmap format, an image file format
- Pharmacy benefit management
- Post-nominal letters for Singapore Pingat Bakti Masyarakat (Public Service Medal)
- Play-by-mail game
- PlaqueBoyMax, a Twitch streamer, record producer, and rapper
- Pretty Bitch Music, forthcoming studio album by Saweetie
- Poultry by-product meal
- Password-based message authentication code, for example, the one defined in RFC 2510/4210 for use in CMP, or PBMAC1, defined in PKCS #5 (RFC 2898/8018), that combines PBKDF2 with a message authentication scheme, such as HMAC-SHA2.
