= Nusrat Jahan Mosque =

Mosque in Hvidovre, Denmark

Nusrat Djahan Mosque
- Nusrat Djahan Moske
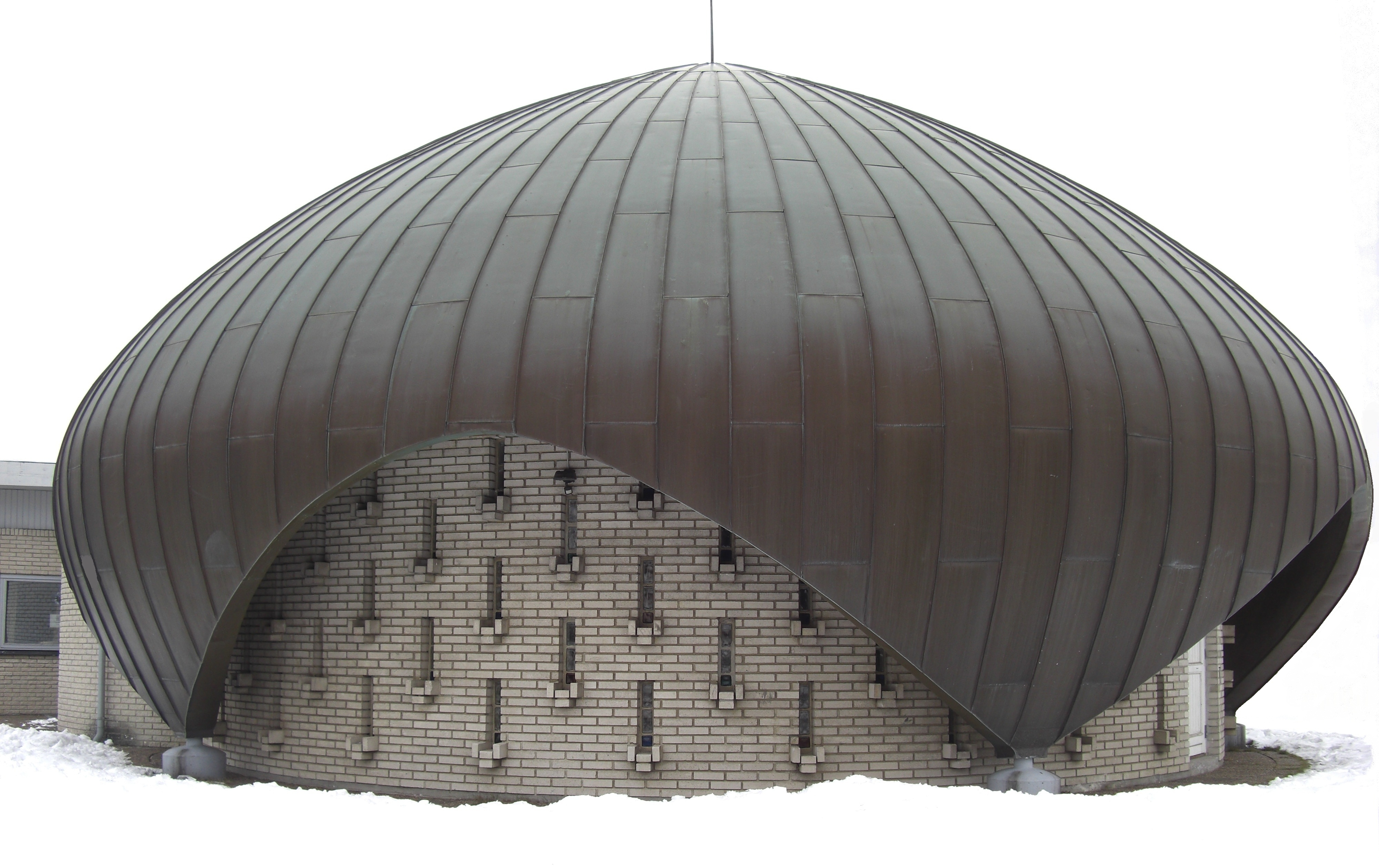

- Location of the mosque on the outskirts of Copenhagen

Religion
- Affiliation: Islam
- Branch/tradition: Ahmadiyya

Location
- Location: Hvidovre, near Copenhagen
- Country: Denmark
- Interactive map of Nusrat Djahan Mosque
- Coordinates: 55°39′04″N 12°28′44″E

Architecture
- Architect: John Zachariassen
- Type: mosque
- Style: Islamic
- Groundbreaking: 6 May 1966
- Completed: 1967

Specifications
- Capacity: 120 worshipers
- Dome: 1

The Nusrat Jahan Mosque (Danish: Nusrat Djahan Moské; Urdu: مسجد نصرت جہان) is an mosque located in Hvidovre, on the outskirts of Copenhagen, Denmark. Completed in 1967, it became the first mosque in Denmark. The mosque was financed solely by the female members of the Ahmadiyya Muslim Community and hold a capacity of 120 worshippers. The mosque is named after Nusrat Jahan Begum, the second wife of Mirza Ghulam Ahmad, the Promised Messiah and Mahdi.

== History ==
The Ahmadiyya Muslim Community and its efforts began in early 1950s. At that time, an Ahmadi Muslim Missionary, Kamal Yousuf was appointed by the Ahmadiyya movement to begin in Denmark. He first toured Denmark in 1956.

=== Planning ===
In 1966, approximately five days prior to construction commencing, the Hvidovre Municipality revoked permission to construct the mosque. The third caliph of the Community, Mirza Nasir Ahmad, was due to arrive in the region, to lay its foundation stone. The mosque's architect, John Zachariassen, reported the situation to the then Prime Minister of Denmark, Jens Otto Krag. Krag gave a notice to ignore the municipal decision and to continue with the construction work. The foundation stone was laid on May 6, 1966, and the mosque, the construction of which gained widespread media attention, was inaugurated a year later by the caliph on July 21, 1967. The opening ceremony was attended by representatives of the Danish government.

== See also ==
- Islam in Denmark
- List of mosques in Denmark
