= Denmark–Morocco relations =

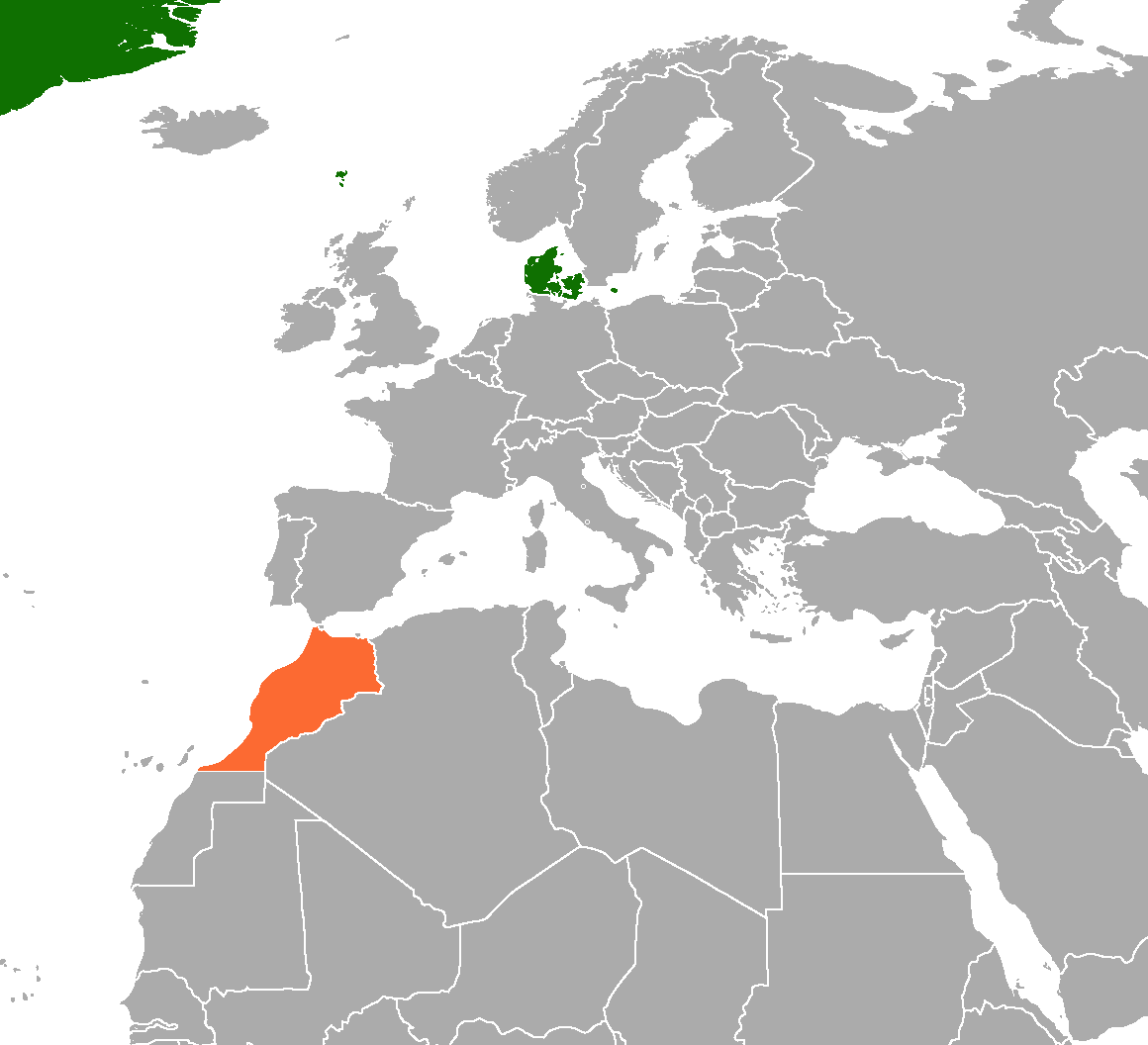
- Denmark: Morocco

Denmark–Morocco relations refers to the current and historical relations between Denmark and Morocco. Denmark has an embassy in Rabat and Morocco has an embassy in Copenhagen. Denmark also sends aid to Morocco as part of the Danish-Arab Partnership Programme. In January 2008, Danish Foreign Minister Per Stig Møller visited Morocco for the opening of the Danish embassy in Rabat. In March 1980, Mohammed VI of Morocco visited Denmark as the Crown Prince of Morocco and Moroccan Foreign Minister Mohamed Benaissa visited Denmark in 2005 and in 2006.

In 2006, Danish export to Morocco amounted 203 million US$ and Moroccan export amounted 18 million US$.

In June 2004, Danish Foreign Minister Per Stig Møller said that Denmark did not "recognise Moroccan sovereignty on Western Sahara", and considered the Moroccan presence in Western Sahara "illegal" and "unacceptable".

In January 2011, Danish Foreign Minister Lene Espersen said that "human rights, and particularly freedom of assembly and press freedom, is an essential part of the ongoing bilateral dialogue between Denmark and Morocco", and has also criticized Morocco for their human rights record in the Western Sahara.

== History ==
Diplomatic relations between Denmark and Morocco were established in 1957. Two years later, Morocco opened an embassy in Oslo, Norway which also were accredited to Denmark. In 1999, Denmark closed their embassy in Morocco because of budget reasons. In 2006, Denmark reopened their embassy in Rabat and both countries desired to strengthen their bilateral relations and trade. In November 2008, Danish Princess Marie visited Morocco to hand over 3500 boxes of Lego for charity.

== Jyllands-Posten Muhammad cartoons controversy ==
On February 2, 2006, protesters in Rabat, Morocco had staged a sit-in before the Parliament in response to the Jyllands-Posten Muhammad cartoons. Newspapers that involved the cartoons were also barred by the Moroccan government.

== Agreements ==
On 25 July 1767, a treaty were signed between Denmark and Morocco. In December 1976, Denmark and Morocco signed an economic and technical agreement. A protection of mutual investment agreement was signed between the two countries in May 2003. In 2004, Denmark and Morocco signed an oil prospecting agreement for oil prospecting in the coast of Tarfaya.

== Resident diplomatic missions ==
- Denmark has an embassy in Rabat.
- Morocco has an embassy in Copenhagen.

== See also ==
- Foreign relations of Denmark
- Foreign relations of Morocco
- Moroccans in Denmark
