= Saliha Marie Fetteh =

Danish writer, lecturer and imam (born 1962)

- Born: Mette Marie Andersen; 19 January 1962 (age 63); Skagen, Denmark
- Occupation(s): Writer, debater, lecturer and imam

Saliha Marie Fetteh (born 19 January 1962 as Mette Marie Andersen) is a Danish author, debater, lecturer and former imam. She co-founded the Mariam Mosque in 2016 and became the first female imam in Scandinavia, along with co-founder Sherin Khankan.

== Early and personal life ==
Fetteh was born as Mette Marie Andersen on 19 January 1962 in Skagen. When she was 12, she moved with her family to Vollsmose in Odense when her father got a job at the Lindø shipyard. She formed strong friendships with Pakistani and Turkish girls in her area after feeling dissatisfied with her local community and gradually embraced their faith, and converted to Islam at the age of 18 and changed her name to Saliha Marie Fetteh.

When she was 24, she met an Iraqi man 18 years her senior who was living in Denmark after fleeing military service. They married and immigrated to Iraq in 1987, after her husband was promised amnesty. However he was arrested upon arrival in Iraq and was only allowed to see her if he returned to the army. Fetteh moved into her husband's childhood home in northern Iraq while her husband had every other weekend off. However, he eventually fled the army again and left Fetteh behind. Without a man's signature, she found herself unable to obtain a residence, work or exit permit and was stranded there. After adjusting to her new situation, she earned a bachelor's degree in Arabic from Al-Mustansiriya University and got a job at a lingerie factory with help from her brother-in-law. In 1995, she left Iraq after all foreigners were ordered to leave the country.

== Career ==
On her return to Denmark, she underwent primary school teacher training and received a cand.mag in Middle Eastern studies at the University of Southern Denmark.

She is a former part-time lecturer at the University of Southern Denmark and a regular commentator for Religion.dk.

In 2016, she published the book Landet mellem de to floder about Iraq and the many years she spent there. In 2019, she released the travel book Alle veje fører til Amman, followed by Maria lærer arabisk - en arabisk læsebog for begyndere in 2021. Three years later, in 2024, she published Med vinden som vidne - slægten fra Uggerby, where she focuses on her own family and her female ancestors in particular.

== Mariam Mosque ==
In 2016, Fetteh, along with Sherin Khankan and others, started the Mariam Mosque in Copenhagen, which made history by becoming the first mosque in Scandinavia to have female imams lead Friday prayers. The mosque received a lot of media attention in Denmark and abroad, but was largely ignored by the Danish Muslim community. A year later, Fetteh left the mosque after disagreeing with Khankan over the theological line, with Fetteh saying her view of Islam was more conservative than the line drawn by the mosque.
