= Moroccans in Denmark =

Total population
- 11,273

Regions with significant populations
- Copenhagen, Aarhus, Brøndby, Albertslund

Languages
- Arabic (Maghrebi Arabic), Berber, Danish

Religion
- Predominantly Islam

Related ethnic groups
- Moroccan diaspora

Moroccans in Denmark are citizens and residents of Denmark who are of Moroccan descent.

== Demographics ==
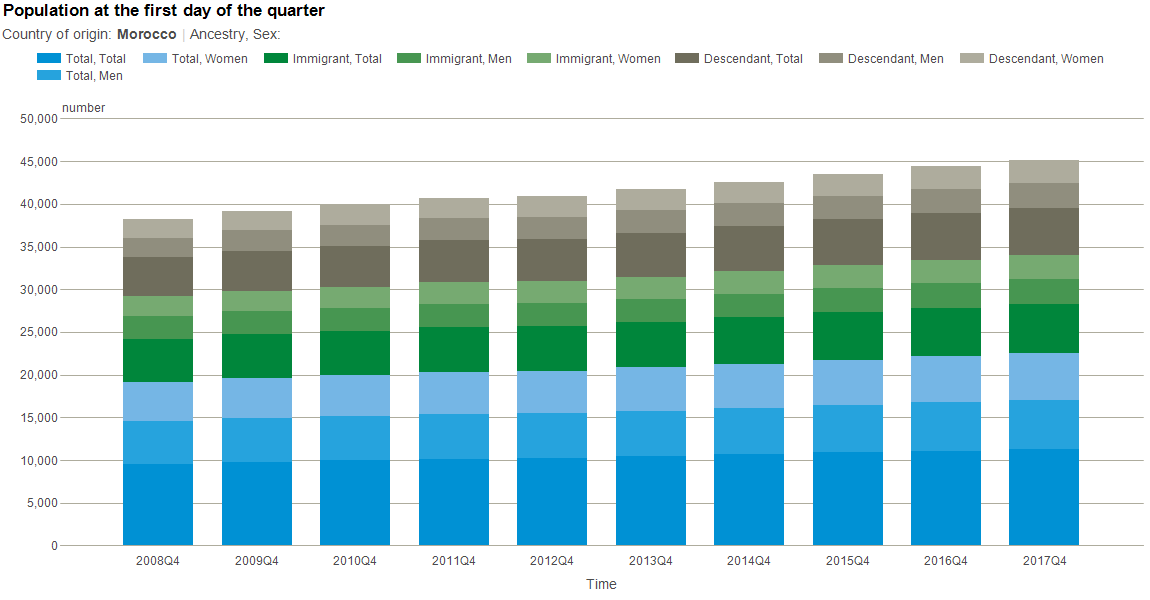
Population of Moroccan origin in Denmark by sex, yearly fourth quarter 2008-2017 (Statistics Denmark).

According to Statistics Denmark, as of 2017, there are a total 11,273 persons of Moroccan origin living in Denmark. Of those individuals, 5,717 are Morocco-born immigrants and 5,556 are descendants of Morocco-born persons. 2,811 individuals are citizens of Morocco (1,227 men, 1,584 women). As of 2016, a total of 77 Morocco-born persons have been granted residence permits in Denmark for family reunification, 19 for study, 144 for work, and 7 for EU/EEA residing family members. Moroccan residents are generally young and middle-aged adults, with most belonging to the 15–19 years (1,054 individuals), 20–24 years (964 individuals), 40–44 years (954 individuals), and 35–39 years (933 individuals) age groups.

== Socioeconomics ==
According to Statistics Denmark, as of 2016, among Morocco-born adults aged 30–59 in Denmark, around 34% of men and 49% of women live full-time in public housing units. Moroccans primarily inhabit the regions of Hovedstaden (9,007), Midtjylland (906), Sjælland (785), Syddanmark (463), and Nordjylland (112), and the cities of Copenhagen (5,307), Aarhus (654), Brøndby (520), and Albertslund (308).

According to Statistics Denmark, as of 2017, a total of 3,446 persons of Moroccan origin in Denmark received public benefits. Of these individuals, the government funds were primarily allocated toward the Danish State Education Grant and Loan Scheme Authority (1,013 persons), social benefits (927 persons), disability pension (554), net unemployment (370 persons), subsidized employment (148 persons), job-based sickness benefits (140 persons), maternity benefits (140 persons), guidance and activities upgrading skills (115 persons), early retirement pay (25 persons), and persons receiving holiday benefits (12 persons).

=== Crime ===
According to Statistics Denmark, Moroccan migrants and their descendants are over-represented as perpetrators of crime. Male Moroccan descendants are about 15 times more likely to commit violent crime. As of 2016, Morocco-born male immigrants in Denmark aged 15–79 have a total crime index of 145 when adjusted for age only, with adjustments of 129 for age and socioeconomic status, 129 for age and family education, and 116 when for age and family income. Their male descendants have a total crime index of 305 when adjusted for age only, with adjustments of 286 for age and socioeconomic status, 240 for age and family education, and 256 for age and family income. With regard to type of infringement, the male descendants of Morocco-born individuals have a penal code crime index of 444 when adjusted for age only (with adjustments of 355 for age and socioeconomic status, 278 age and family education, and 288 for age and family income), of which the crime index when adjusted for age only is 356 for violent offences (with adjustments of 289 for age and socioeconomic status, 215 age and family education, and 229 for age and family income) and 417 for property offences (with adjustments of 332 for age and socioeconomic status, 262 age and family education, and 265 for age and family income). The crime index when adjusted for age only is 280 for traffic law (with adjustments of 278 for age and socioeconomic status, 237 for age and family education, and 259 for age and family income) and 349 for special laws (with adjustments of 314 for age and socioeconomic status, 266 age and family education, and 279 for age and family income). The average crime index among the general Danish population is set at 100 and percentage points above or below that baseline reflect greater or lesser prevalence, depending on a population's most common age group and its relative socioeconomic status. As of 2016, a total of 642 persons of Moroccan origin were found guilty of crimes. Of these individuals, 560 were males and 82 were females, with males between the ages of 15–29 years (285 individuals) and 30–49 years (218 individuals) constituting most of the total. The most common types of offences were violations of traffic law (312 individuals, of which 283 breached the Road Traffic Act), followed by violations of special laws (244 individuals, of which 109 breached the Euphoriants Act) and the penal code (191 individuals, of which 121 made offences against property). Most of the persons received a fine (488 individuals), with the remainder given unsuspended imprisonment (71 individuals), suspended imprisonment (65 individuals), withdrawal of charges (10 individuals), preventive measures (5 individuals), other decisions (2 individuals), or no charges (1 individual).

== Employment ==
According to Statistics Denmark, as of 2014, Morocco-born immigrants aged 30–64 in Denmark have an employment rate of approximately 48.6%.

According to the Institute of Labor Economics, as of 2014, Morocco-born residents in Denmark have an employment population ratio of about 46%. They also have an unemployment rate of roughly 13%.

== See also ==
- Denmark–Morocco relations
- Moroccan diaspora
- Islam in Denmark
- Arabs in Denmark
- Immigration to Denmark
