= Ahmadiyya in Denmark =

Islamic movement

Ahmadiyya is an Islamic branch in Denmark, under the spiritual leadership of the caliph in London. Kamal Yousuf, an Ahmadi Muslim missionary, who was appointed for disseminating Ahmadiyya teachings in Scandinavia, first toured Denmark in 1956. The earliest Danes to have converted to the movement were from the 1950s and the Community was first established in 1959, during the last few years of the Second Caliphate. Today, there are two Ahmadi mosques, of which one is purpose-built mosque, the oldest in the country. There are an estimated 600 Ahmadi Muslims in the country.

== History ==
=== Recognition ===
Ahmadiyya efforts in Scandinavia began in the 1950s, when an Ahmadi Muslim missionary, Kamal Yousuf, originally from Pakistan, was appointed to open Ahmadiyya missions in the region. Although Yousuf was primarily based in Sweden, he first toured Denmark in 1956. Some of the earliest Danes to have converted to the Islamic faith were also from the 1950s and the 1960s, and who predominantly converted to the Ahmadiyya movement. Among the converts of that period, estimated at almost 30, was Svend Aage Madsen, a teacher who adopted the name Abdus Salam Madsen. Despite Yousuf’s initial engagement, Islam was introduced in Denmark by converts as opposed to, by foreigners. In other European countries it was foreign missionaries who were chiefly responsible for introducing the religion.

In 1961, led by Madsen, the then national vice-president of Community, Ahmadi Muslims applied for recognition as a religious community in Denmark by a royal decree. The Community requested for the civil recognition of Islamic marriage ceremonies and funeral services. However, the Ministry for Ecclesiastical Affairs rejected the application on the basis of the size of the congregation. In 1973, once again led by Madsen, reported that of the 12,000 Muslims in the country, 3,000 to 4,000 of them were associated to the new mosque. However, by this period, royal decree, as form of recognition had been abolished. Nevertheless, a year later, in 1974, the Community was recognized as the first Muslim community of Denmark.

=== Early efforts ===
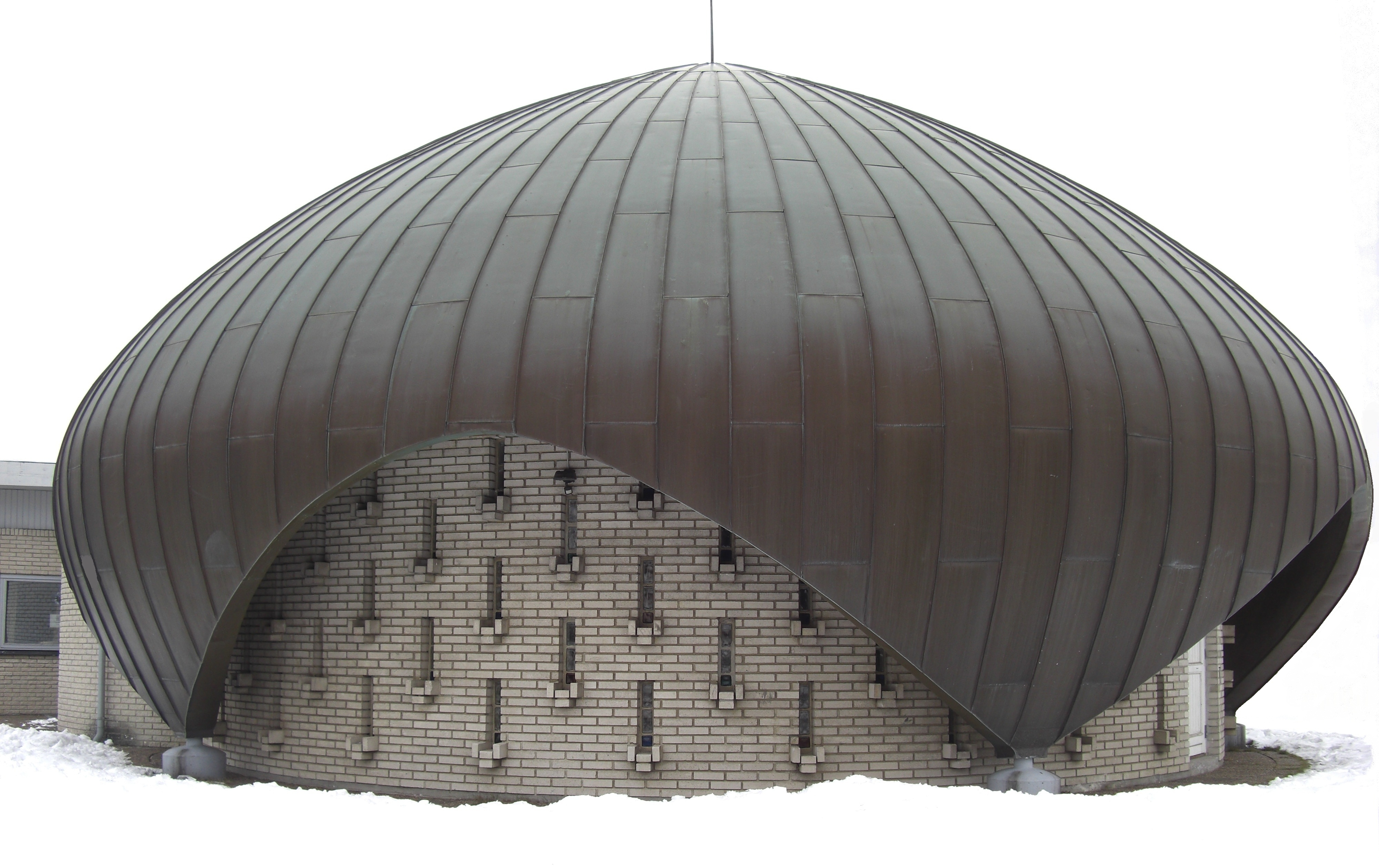
The Nusrat Djahan Mosque in Hvidore, on the outskirts of Copenhagen is the oldest mosque in Denmark

In 1967, Ahmadi Muslims built Denmark’s first mosque, in Hvidovre, on the outskirts of Copenhagen. Named after Nusrat Jahan Begum, the second wife of Mirza Ghulam Ahmad, the Nusrat Djahan Mosque was financed solely by female members of the Community. This move was perhaps motivated by the country’s push for gender equality and female empowerment. In 1966, roughly five days prior to construction, the Hvidovre Municipality revoked its initial permission to construct the mosque. On the other hand, the third caliph of the Community, Mirza Nasir Ahmad was due to arrive in the region, to lay its foundation. The mosque’s architect, John Zachariassen, reported the situation to the then Prime Minister of Denmark, Jens Otto Krag. Krag gave a notice to ignore the municipal decision and to continue with the construction work. The foundation stone was finally laid on May 6, 1966 and the mosque, the construction of which gained widespread media attention, was inaugurated a year later by the caliph on July 21, 1967. The opening ceremony was attended by representatives of the Danish government.

Islam was properly introduced in Denmark by converts to the Ahmadiyya movement, as opposed to, by foreigners. Some converts attempted to publish Danish literature in order to gain more converts. Aktiv Islam, translated as "Active Islam" was one magazine started by the Community, which primarily featured Danish translations of articles published in English magazines. In 1967, the Community published the first translation of the Quran in Danish. The main translator was Abdus Salam Madsen himself, whose publication was the sole translation available to the Danish public for over four decades. Until the late 1980s, Madsen was seen as the leading public figure of Islam in Denmark.

== Demographics ==
Locations of the two Ahmadi Muslim mosques in Denmark.

During the period of the 1950s and the 1960s there were an estimated 30 Danes who converted to the movement. The Community has not been able to attract similar numbers since then. Today, besides a number of converts, the majority of the members consist of immigrant populations from Pakistan. There are roughly 600 Ahmadi Muslims in the country.

There are two Ahmadi Muslim mosques, of which one is purpose built. The Nusrat Djahan Mosque, which lies on the outskirts of Copenhagen, in Hvidovre, is the oldest in the country. The Baitul Hamd Mosque is in Nakskov, a small town in southern Denmark.

== See also ==
- Islam in Denmark
