= Hamad Bin Khalifa Civilisation Center =

Mosque in Copenhagen, Denmark

- Moskeen i Rovsingsgade
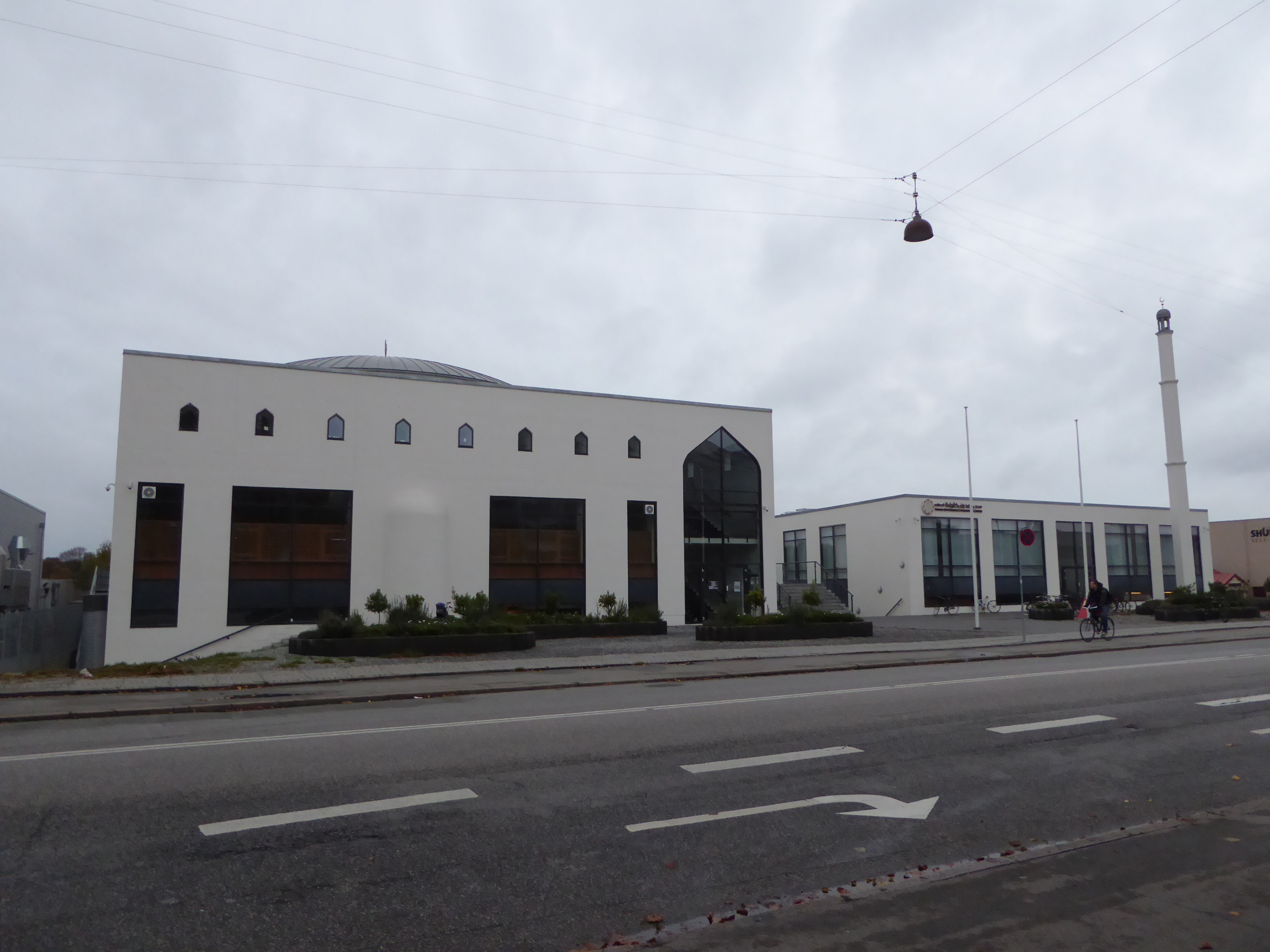

- Location of the mosque in Copenhagen

Religion
- Affiliation: Sunni Islam
- Sect: Salafi
- Ecclesiastical or organizational status: Mosque
- Ownership: Danish Islamic Council
- Status: Active

Location
- Location: Outer Nørrebro, Copenhagen
- Country: Denmark
- Interactive map of Hamad Bin Khalifa Civilisation Center
- Coordinates: 55°42′30″N 12°32′56″E

Architecture
- Architects: Jan Wenzel; Lars Tuxen
- Type: Mosque
- Completed: 2014

Specifications
- Capacity: 3,000 worshipers
- Dome: 1
- Minaret: 1
- Materials: Titanium, glass, polished concrete

Website
- hbkcc.dk (in Danish)

The Hamad Bin Khalifa Civilisation Center (Danish: Moskeen i Rovsingsgade), abbreviated as HBKCC, also called the Grand Mosque of Copenhagen, is a mosque in the Outer Nørrebro borough of Copenhagen, Denmark. Built in 2014, it is one of the largest mosques in Europe.

== History ==
In September 2013, as the mosque was still under construction, critics rose about the plan to broadcast the official Hamas-run television channel Al-Aqsa TV in the media center of the mosque, Hamas being blacklisted as a terrorist organization in the European Union (of which Denmark is a member).

In June 2014, the Danish Islamic Council opened the Grand Mosque of Copenhagen (officially Hamad Bin Khalifa Civilisation Center, after the Emir of Qatar Hamad bin Khalifa Al Thani), the country's largest mosque, and the first one with a minaret. Qatar provided $27 million to finance the construction, which led the Danish People's Party to express their concerns about potential Qatari interference in Danish domestic affairs. The Danish royal family and government ministers were invited to attend the opening but declined the invitation, with only Copenhagen's deputy mayor for social issues Jesper Christensen attending.

It was agreed with the municipality of Copenhagen that the minaret would not be used to broadcast a call to prayer. However, there are a number of small speakers mounted above the doors on either side of the courtyard so the call to prayer can be heard by worshippers outside the main prayer hall.

The group Stop Islamisation of Denmark had planned to protest in front of the building the day of its opening, but was banned by the police.

In 2020, Berlingske newspaper reported that the mosque had received 227 kr. million (more than €23 million) from investors in Qatar.

== Description ==
The mosque was designed by the Danish architects Jan Wenzel & Lars Tuxen and is the property of the Danish Islamic Council. It has the capacity to host 3,000 worshipers indoors, and an extra 1,500 in an inner sahn. The mosque's exterior is made of titanium, glass and polished concrete. Many architectural elements symbolize the link of the building with Mecca.

== See also ==
- Islam in Denmark
- List of mosques in Denmark
