= Danish Islamic Council =

Islamic organization based in Denmark

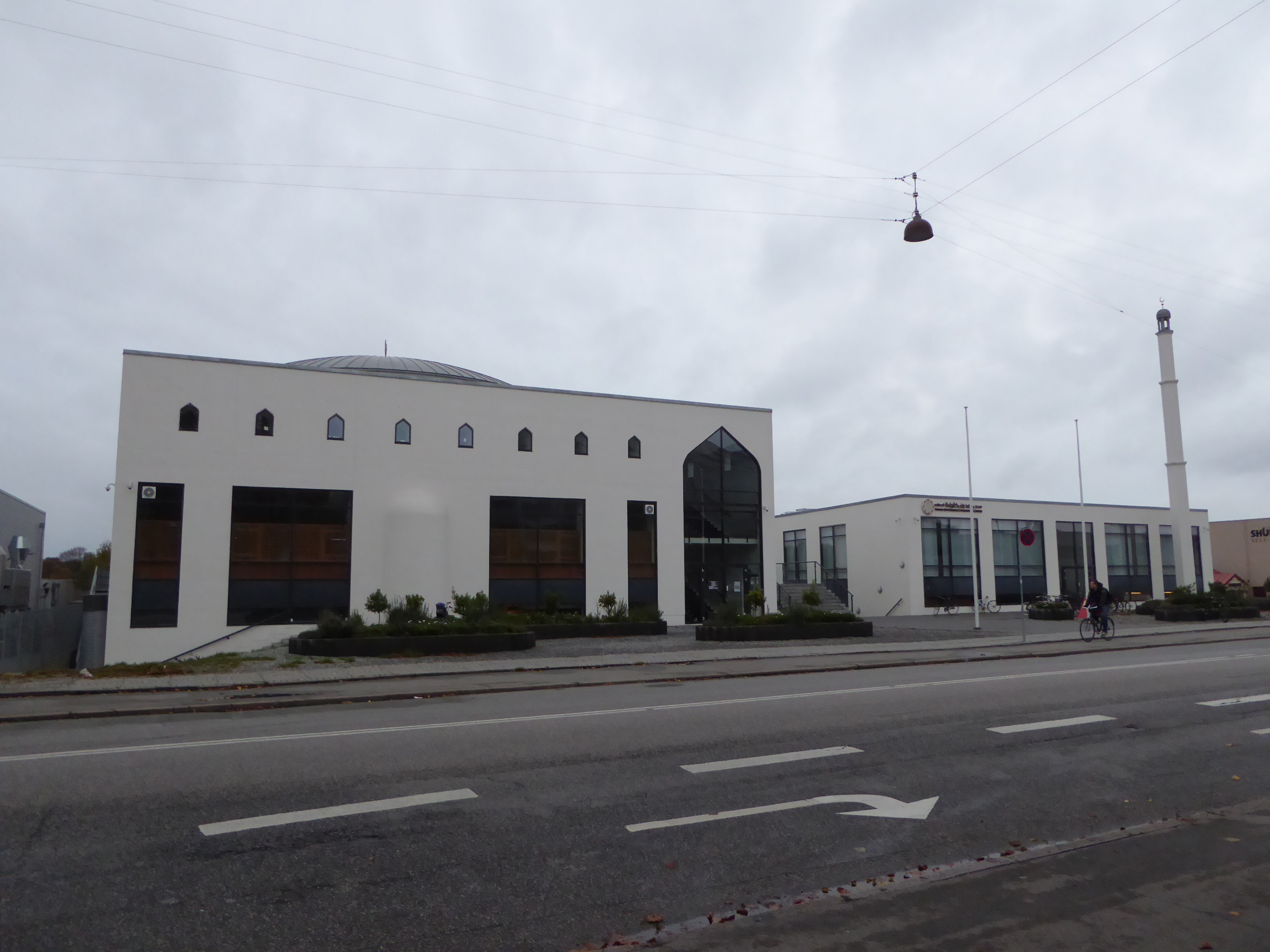
- The council's headquarters in the Hamad Bin Khalifa Mosque
- Founded: 2000
- Headquarters: Hamad Bin Khalifa Mosque, Copenhagen
- Region served: Denmark
- Parent organization: Federation of Islamic Organizations in Europe

The Danish Islamic Council (Danish: Dansk Islamisk Råd) is a Danish Islamic organization representing Sunni Muslims in Denmark.

== History ==
The council was initiated in 2000, by the politician Hamid El-Mousti and gathered 30 associations of Muslims upon its creation. The council is a member of the Muslim Brotherhood-linked Federation of Islamic Organizations in Europe (FIOE).

In June 2014, the Danish Islamic Council opened the Grand Mosque of Copenhagen (officially Hamad Bin Khalifa Civilisation Center, after the Emir of Qatar Hamad bin Khalifa Al Thani), the country's largest mosque, and the first one with a minaret. Qatar provided $27 million to finance the construction, which led the Danish People's Party to express their concerns about potential interference of the Qataris in the Danish domestic affairs.

In 2015, it condemned the 2015 Copenhagen shootings against secular and Jewish targets, saying, "The Danish Islamic Council invites everyone in Danish society to unite in the fight against extremism and terrorism." In April 2015, the council was in favor of the Saudi Arabian-led intervention in Yemen.

The Danish Islamic Council said that the Grand Mosque of Copenhagen "had chosen a moderate approach of Islam", but in a TV documentary that was aired in March 2016, on TV 2, a female reporter with a hidden camera recorded the imam of the mosque preaching a radical vision of Sunni Islam.

== See also ==
- Grand Mosque of Copenhagen
