= Naser Khader =

Syrian-Danish politician

- ناصر خضر
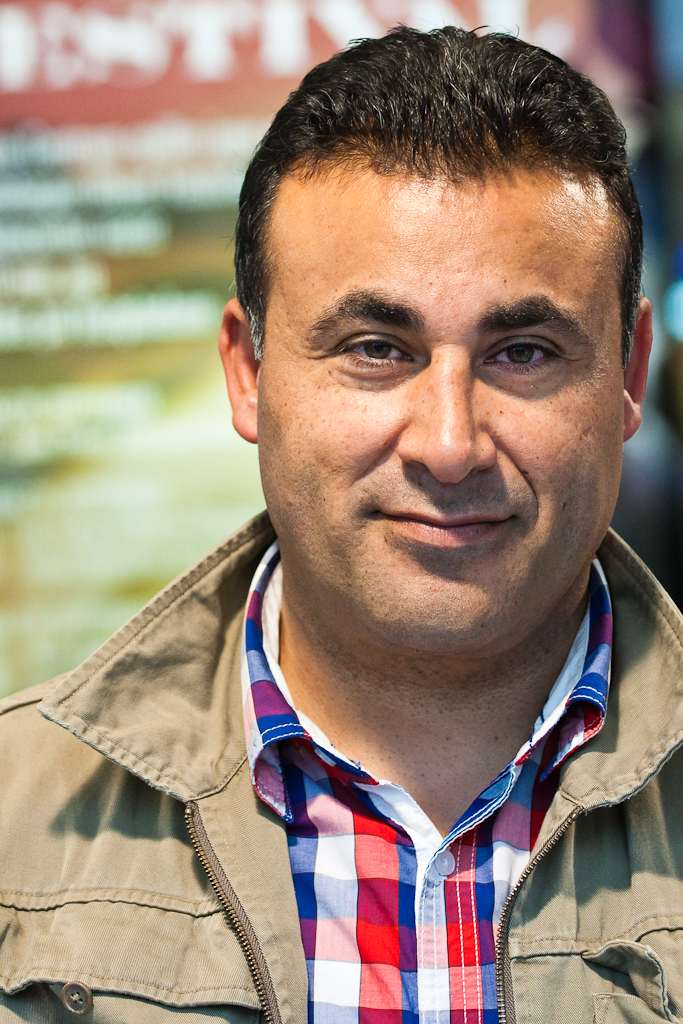

Member of the Folketing
- In office 18 June 2015 – 1 November 2022
- Constituency: Zealand (from 2019); East Jutland (2015—2019)
- In office 20 November 2001 – 15 September 2011
- Constituency: Copenhagen (2007—2011); Østre (2001—2007)

Leader of New Alliance
- In office 7 May 2007 – 5 January 2009
- Succeeded by: Anders Samuelsen

Personal details
- Born: 1 July 1963 (age 63) Damascus, Syria
- Party: Independent (2021–present)
- Other political affiliations: Social Liberal Party (1984–2007); New Alliance (2007–2009); Conservative People's Party (2009–2021)
- Domestic partner: Bente Dalsbæk (until 2010)
- Children: 2
- Occupation: Senior Fellow of Hudson Institute; Middle East expert and TV commentator Radio host
- Profession: Cand.polit.
- Website: Khader.dk

Naser Khader (Arabic: ناصر خضر Levantine pronunciation: Arabic pronunciation: [ˈnɑːsˤer xɑdˤer]; born 1 July 1963) is a Syrian-Danish politician and member of the Folketing 2001–2011 and again 2015–2022. Until 2021 he was a member of the Conservative People's Party.

He was first elected to Parliament representing the Danish Social Liberal Party in 2001. In 2007, he left this party to found New Alliance (later Liberal Alliance). In the national elections on 13 November 2007, Naser Khader's New Alliance party won five parliamentary seats. After a tumultuous year, the party dissolved and Khader became an independent Member of the Danish Parliament until joining the Conservative People's Party on 17 March 2009. Khader lost his seat in the 2011 Danish parliamentary election, but regained it in the 2015 election. In 2021, Khader left the Conservative People's Party and announced he would not run for re-election.

In 2000, he introduced the idea of a 24-year rule. In his book 'Khader.dk', he argued that the rule should be included in the Danish immigration law to prevent forced marriages. The 24-year rule was introduced in 2002. It was voted into law supported by all major political parties in Parliament as Immigration Law §9, 1.

A leading proponent of peaceful co-existence of democracy and Islam, Khader co-founded an association of opponents of Islamic supremacism and jihadism in 2008, with the aim to promote freedom of speech and inspire moderate Muslims worldwide when the Jyllands-Posten Muhammad cartoons controversy began. The new movement was called Moderate Muslims, later renamed Democratic Muslims. In 2023, Khader converted to Christianity and opted to pursue priesthood within the Evangelical Lutheran Church of Denmark. He expressed that while the Quran instilled fear within him, he discovered love within the Bible.

In 2009, Khader first suggested a complete ban on the burqa as part of an integration initiative by the Conservatives' parliamentary group, describing it as "un-Danish" and "oppression of women". But it wasn't before May 2018, lawmakers approved the law, suggested by Khader and popularly known as the Burqa Ban.

Naser Khader has been named among the hundred most influential Danes of the 20th Century, and has been one of the world's 500 most influential Muslims since 2009.

== Background ==
Naser Khader is the son of a Palestinian father and a Syrian mother. He was raised in a small rural town outside Damascus in the traditional Syrian way. As a Palestinian refugee, his father had difficulties getting a good job in Syria, and although they lived in his wife's village, she was often referred to as "The one who married a stranger".

Naser Khader was named after Egyptian president Gamal Abdel Nasser. Khader's father emigrated to Europe in the 1960s – a period when European countries had begun to solicit immigration by foreign workers. Naser himself did not join his father until 1974, when he moved from his village in Syria to a flat in central Copenhagen, Denmark. He graduated from the Rysensteen Gymnasium in 1983.

== Political career ==
Naser Khader was elected to parliament in 2001.

=== 24-year rule ===
In 2000, he introduced the idea of a 24-year rule. In his book 'Khader.dk', he argued that the rule should be included in the Danish immigration law to prevent forced marriages. Once voted into law, the 24-year rule would define Danish politics for over a decade. Although still controversial, a 2023 Rockwool Foundation report said it reduced the number of family reunifications and that the generation of young etnnic women that grew up after the rule became part of the immigration law would marry later, have children later, be better educated and marry a man whom they met in Denmark.

=== Jyllands-Posten ===
In 2006, he was awarded Jyllands-Posten's Freedom of Expression Award. As the newspaper had published cartoons of the Islamic prophet Muhammad, journalist Tim Jensen reported that "practicing Muslims" in Denmark developed negative and hostile perceptions of him.

Ahmed Akkari, spokesman for the group of Danish imams that toured the Middle East seeking support during the Jyllands-Posten Muhammad cartoons controversy, said the following about Khader:

"If Khader becomes Minister of Integration, it will be likely that someone will dispatch two guys to blow him and the Ministry up." Vid. (Fr.)

In light of Akkari's threat, Khader stated that he had to consider whether or not to continue in politics. When Akkari was later confronted with his statement, he said that he was joking. Later, on 1 April 2006, Khader indicated that he would return to politics.

=== Network of journalists ===
Early in his career, Khader was on good terms with a number of notable political commentators and journalists. He also became friendly with Prime Minister Anders Fogh Rasmussen, as well as two of the former press secretaries of the Danish Prime Minister.

In a documentary about the Jyllands-Posten Muhammad cartoons controversy, Naser Khader is shown jogging with political commentator Henrik Qvortrup, exclaiming, "I don't want to give that idiot any more screentime", referring to Ahmed Akkari. However, during the 2007 parliamentary election campaign, Qvortrup published a story in his tabloid magazine Se og Hør, accusing Khader of tax fraud. In reaction, Khader called Qvortrup a "pig", a common Danish insult similar to the word "jerk". In December 2012 Khader was completely exonerated of the allegations of fraud but his good relations to the media suffered greatly from the incident. Qvortrup, however, maintains that the story was true.

=== New political party ===
Previously a member of the Social Liberal Party, Khader withdrew from the Party on 7 May 2007 in order to create his own party, New Alliance.

"My reasons for leaving the Social Liberal Party were many. I had long been frustrated by the naiveté among my fellow party members, especially during the cartoon crisis. A lot of them condemned the Jyllands-Posten newspaper for printing the cartoons, but had a hard time condemning the overreaction to the cartoons in the Middle East. My former party represents typical European intellectual cultural relativism and naiveté at its worst. Their general view goes something like this: all views are equal. In the 1980s and ’90s, I shared that view, but I don’t anymore. Today I have become averse to cultural relativism. I find it old-fashioned and immature. I call those who hold such views "halal hippies," and no longer believe that all values are equal. Some values are better than others, and democratic values will always stand above the rest. To me, democracy comes before religion, because democracy includes people of all kinds, while religion and culture have a tendency to exclude people who hold a different view or lifestyle."

In the national election held on 13 November 2007, the New Alliance party succeeded in winning five seats. This was the first time a new party had been elected to parliament since 1987. On 5 January 2009, the party dissolved and turned into the Liberal Alliance. Following a short period as an independent Member of the Danish Parliament, Khader joined the Conservative People's Party on 17 March 2009.

=== Burqa Ban ===
In 2009, Khader first suggested a complete ban on the burqa as part of an integration initiative by the Conservatives' parliamentary group, describing it as "un-Danish" and "oppression of women". However, it was not until 2018 that Denmark banned garments that covered faces, including Islamic veils such as the niqab and burqa. In a 75-30 vote with 74 absentees, lawmakers approved the law, suggested by Khader and popularly known as the Burqa Ban.

=== Law of Consent ===
In 2018, Khader advocated for a Law of Consent. Khader argued that it was "deeply worrying that there is such a large increase in rape cases [among immigrants]", and that the existing Sexual Offences Act did not provide adequate protection for victims of rape.

=== Wales Pledge ===
As Chairman of Danish Parliament's Defense Committee from 2018, Khader became a prominent advocate for the Wales Pledge, increasing defense spending to 2% of GDP.

=== Out of Politics ===
Khader was not re-elected in the 2011 Danish general elections. He joined Hudson Institute as Senior Fellow before running successfully for parliament in the national election on 18 June 2015. Khader left the Conservative People's Party in August 2021 and continued as an independent member of the Danish parliament. He also announced he would not run for re-election.

== Controversies ==
=== Plagiarism ===
In 2003, the Danish daily newspaper Politiken described how Khader had plagiarized a number of passages in his book 'Ære og Skam'. Apparently, passages in the book were copied from two of his worst critics at the time, a Danish Muslim writer, Aminah Tønnesen and dr.theol. Lissi Rasmussen. Khader defended himself, calling the it a mistake that was unintentional and falderal.

In 2017, Naser Khader was again accused of plagiarism when the Danish weekly newspaper Weekendavisen revealed that the book 'Hjertet Bløder', which Naser Khader co-wrote with journalist Stig Matthiesen, consisted of material from other books, articles and reference work like Wikipedia without any references. Publishing house Peoples Press withdrew the book immediately with consent of the writers. None of the writers would take responsibility for either accidental plagiarism or intentional plagiarism.

=== Libel Case ===
In September 2017, Naser Khader and two other members of parliament, Marcus Knuth and Martin Henriksen, sent an email to three other members of Parliament. In the email, put out a number of serious accusations against female imam Sherin Khankan and her colleague in the so-called 'Exit Circle', an NGO helping women subjected to violence and religious and social control. The intention with the email was to prevent a planned funding of the 'Exit Circle'. Naser Khader and the two other members of Parliament refused to apologize for the accusations in the e-mail against Khankan and Khankan took the libel case to the High Court where she lost. The Supreme Court later upheld the High Court's decision to acquit Khader, Marcus Knuth and Martin Henriksen of libel.

=== Assault allegations ===
In July 2021, five women alleged Khader of having assaulted them on several occasions in the early 2000s, including having attempted to force one of the women to have sexual intercourse with him. Khader denied all allegations. Following an independent legal investigation, several lawyers concluded that Khader could not sue for libel, as none of the charges were libelous. After the investigation, Khader left the Conservative People's Party. Khader continued as an independent member of the Danish parliament. At the time, he stated: "In a society governed by the rule of law, it's frustrating that I can not really defend myself and be cleared by the courts. I have already - without trial - paid dearly for the accusations. Such cases should be decided by the courts - otherwise we are no better than the regimes we usually point fingers at."

== Honours ==
- Order of the Dannebrog, Knight

== Bibliography ==
- Den duftende have (2019)
- Hjertet bløder - arabisk forår og opløsning (2015)
- Bekendelser fra en kulturkristen Muslim (2013)
- Naser Khader og folkestyret (2005)
- Tro mod tro (2005, co-author)
- Modsætninger mødes (2003, co-author)
- Nasers Brevkasse (2001)
- Khader.dk (2000, co-author)
- Ære og Skam (1996)

Political offices
Preceded by None	Leader of the Liberal Alliance; 2007—2009	Succeeded by Anders Samuelsen
