= Abdul Wahid Pedersen =

Danish Imam (born 1954)

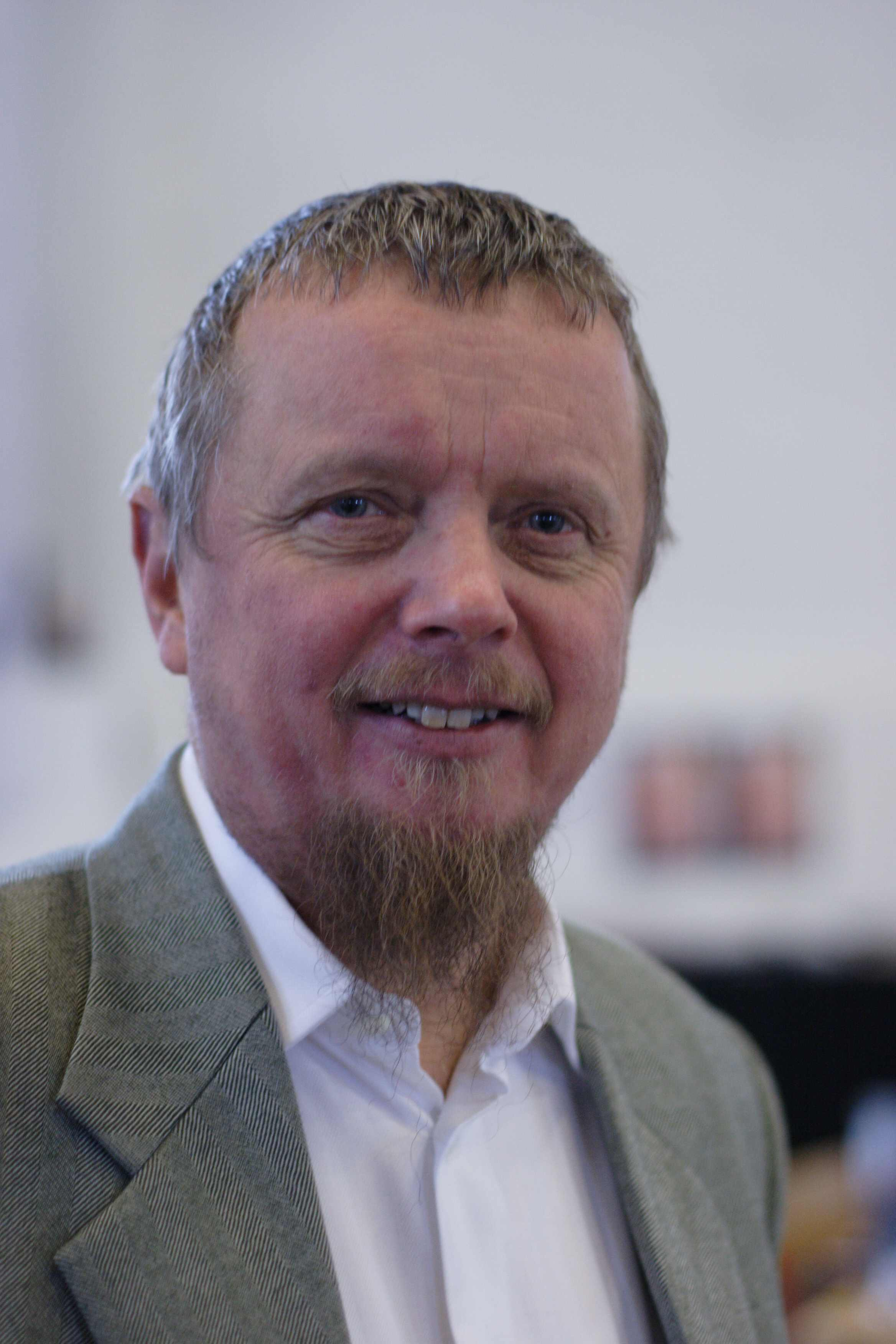
- Born: Reino Arild Pedersen; 1954 (age 71–72)
- Occupation: Imam

Abdul Wahid Pedersen (born Reino Arild Pedersen in 1954) is a Danish Imam.

== Personal life ==
Pedersen was born in Sweden, and his mother is Finnish. Pedersen embraced Islam in 1982 after a long search through different world religions. He was brought up as a Christian, became a free-thinker at the age of 16 and was a follower of Hinduism for four years before eventually deciding on Islam, converting in 1982.

Before joining Islam, he lived for some time in a small commune in Jylland, at which time he smoked and also bought and sold cannabis. Following this, in December 1983 he was sentenced one year and four months in prison after the drug section 191 of the Criminal Code.

He is married to a Moroccan wife, and the two have four children, among whom the Danish author Zahra Pedersen.

== Career ==
Pedersen was Vice President of Muslims in Dialogue in the early years of the existence of the organization, which is a Danish Muslim multi-ethnic organization promoting Islam into the Danish society.

Pedersen is Vice Chairman of Muslim Council of Denmark, which at one time was the largest body of Muslim organizations in Denmark.

He is co-founder and principal of three private schools for children of Muslim parents in Denmark. He is also co-founder and long-time vice chairman of Islamic Christian Study Center in Copenhagen. He spearheaded relief projects in numerous countries worldwide. E.g. the establishing of a school in the Kunar province of Afghanistan before the Taliban regime which accepted girls as well.

He has translated a number of books on Islam into Danish. In 1997 he was the first imam to start holding Friday sermons in Danish.

== Charity work ==
Pedersen founded the Independent Scandinavian Relief Agency (ISRA) in 1988 and served as its Secretary General. ISRA had its accounts frozen by the Danish authorities in late 2004 when the American Ministry of Finance erroneously linked it to the organisation Islamic African Relief Agency and allegations of supporting terrorism. After having examined the case, in 2005 the Danish police acquitted the ISRA of all suspicions of having supported terrorism. However, during the nine months of investigation, the economic means of the organisation were frozen, eliminating the impact of its projects.

Afterwards, in 2005 Pedersen was a co-founder of Danish Muslim Aid and for a number of years Secretary General of same organization. DM-Aid has, among other things, rebuilt more than 500 homes for earthquake stricken people in the Kashmir area of Pakistan during the winter 2005 - 2006. The organization supports more than 700 orphans in more than 10 countries, finances hundreds of micro-finance projects for poor families in Africa, Middle East and South East Asia. Danish Muslim Aid is the largest charity organization in Denmark founded by Muslims. He is one of the European representatives of the Global Network of Religions for Children and is a board member of the Swedish Islamic Academy.

== Controversies ==
In May 2007 he said that he would normally oppose polygamy, unless the first wife would agree and give a good reason for it, such as herself being unable to have children.

Pedersen in a debate in 2002 stated that stoning as a punishment for adultery, though a terrible form of punishment, was ordained by God, which could not in itself be disputed by humans. His statement caused other Danish muslims like Sherin Khankan to disagree publicly, maintaining that it is possible to simultaneously be an orthodox Muslim and take exception to stoning.
