= 24-year rule =

Danish immigration law

The 24-year rule is the popular name for a rule in Danish immigration law §9. It states a number of requirements to a married couple if they want a permanent residence in Denmark. It is meant to cut down forced marriages and family reunification immigration.

== Requirements ==
The rule has four requirements:

1. Age – Non-resident spouses can be united and thus cohabit with their spouse living in Denmark only when both parties have reached the age of 24 years.
2. Ties – The couple's aggregate ties to Denmark must be stronger than those to the country of origin. However, the demands of aggregate ties are not applicable to people born in Denmark or people who acquired Danish citizenship as young children and have lived in Denmark for more than 28 years.
3. Economy – The Danish spouse must prove to be able to financially support the new couple (there is a minimum income requirement of twice the welfare benefit rate), post a DKK 100,000 guaranty (the sum is adjusted for inflation annually), and not have received welfare benefits for a year and not owe money to the authorities.
4. Residence – The couple must show that they own or rent a residence of at most two people per room and at least 20 m^{2} (217 ft^{2}) per person.

== Support and criticism ==
The rule has drawn criticism from human rights organizations.

The rule is supported by all major political parties in Denmark except Enhedslisten. Some Danish politicians have advocated increasing it to 28 years of age. Also advocated by the Progress Party in neighbouring country Norway, centre-right parties agreed to implement the rule there in 2014.
