= Knud Holmboe =

Danish journalist, author and explorer

Ali Ahmed el Gheseiri
- علي أحمد الغزيري
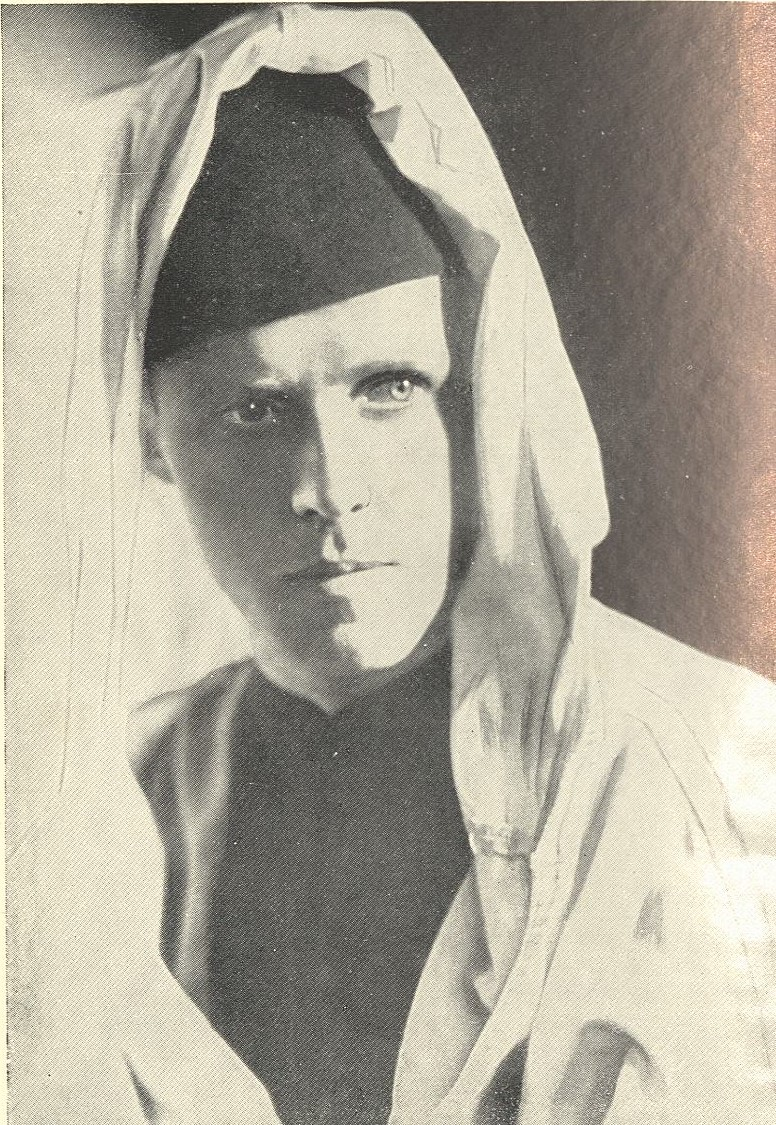
- Portrait in Ørkenen Brænder, 1931
- Born: Knud Valdemar Gylding Holmboe; April 22, 1902; Horsens, Denmark
- Died: October 13, 1931 (aged 29); Aqaba, Jordan

Knud Valdemar Gylding Holmboe (22 April 1902 Horsens Denmark – 13 October 1931 Aqaba, Jordan) was a Danish journalist, author and explorer. He converted from Protestantism to Catholicism in 1921, and, after a sojourn in North Africa, ultimately converted to Islam in 1929, changing his name to Ali Ahmed el Gheseiri.

He is best known for his 1931 book Desert Encounter (Danish: Ørkenen Brænder, lit. 'the Desert is on Fire'), which exposed the maltreatment of the population the author had witnessed on his journey through Libya and the atrocities committed by the Italian colonial power. This account is especially valuable for its description of the concentration camps into which Italian colonial powers forced the Bedouin and where "torture, humiliation, and famine" were rife. Holmboe was murdered on his way to Makkah in Aqaba in October 1931. Some suspect that Italian intelligence officials, connected to the regime of Benito Mussolini, conspired in his death.

== Early life and education ==
Knud Holmboe was born as the eldest son of a well-known Danish merchant family in Horsens, Jutland. His younger brother, Vagn Holmboe, went on to become a composer. In his late teenage years he became increasingly interested in religion and philosophy, and at the age of twenty, he moved into a monastery in Clervaux/Clerf in northern Luxembourg and he converted to Catholicism in 1921. After finishing an education as a journalist, he started to work for various Danish local papers.

== Career and travels ==
In search of deeper religious knowledge, Holmboe traveled to Morocco in 1924 and became acquainted with Islam. During a meeting with a sheikh, he realized that he belonged to Islam and converted the following year. His first book Between the Devil and the Deep Sea. A Dash by Plane to Seething Morocco was translated from Danish and published in 1924 by Klinte Publishers. After returning to Denmark, he wrote two books recounting his experiences in Morocco.

In 1925, he began a journey across the countries of the Middle East (Turkey, Syria, Palestine, Iraq and Persia). In 1927, he travelled through the Balkans and witnessed the mistreatment of the population by Italian troops in Albania. He took a photograph of the hanging of a dissident Catholic priest by Mussolini's soldiers in Albania. This picture was published in newspapers around the globe and, along with articles that went public all over Europe, infuriated the Italian authorities.

Back in Denmark, he experienced economic difficulties and in 1928 he ultimately took the decision to leave the country along with his wife Nora and his daughter Aisha who was born earlier that year. He went to Morocco for the second time, settled down with his family and changed his name to Ali Ahmed el Gheseiri. Two years later, in 1930, his wife took the decision to return with her child to Denmark. Instead of returning, he took a plan to travel from Morocco across the Sahara to reach Egypt. It was this journey that made him famous. Driving through the desert in a 1929 Chevrolet, he left the beaten track to discover the communities and landscape of the desert. Holmboe was shocked to observe European violence against the indigenous populations of the North African colonies.

In Libya, he witnessed the shocking treatment of the Libyan Muslim population by Italian colonial troops. Holmboe wrote extensively about what he saw and took photographs as documentation. His activities did not remain unnoticed by the Italians; In the eastern city of Derna, he was arrested and kicked out of Libya. In Egypt, he tried to organize resistance against the Italian colonial power in Libya. However, after the Italian ambassador had informed the British authorities in Egypt, he was arrested again and thrown into prison in Cairo. After a month, he was sent home to Denmark. Back in Denmark, he produced a book in 1931 based on these travel experiences, entitled Desert Encounter condemning the colonial regimes of North Africa and particularly the Italian colonial government that terrorized the Muslim population in Libya. The book was published both in Denmark, in many other European countries and the USA, but immediately banned in Fascist Italy. The Italian colonial powers were outraged at the suggestion that the Muslim population of Libya was being subjected to genocide.

== Later life and death ==
After completing his book, he started on his hajj, to Makkah in May 1931. Holmboe bought a camel in Amman and travelled to Aqaba (in modern Jordan) where he waited for an entry permit into Ibn Saud’s territory. On 11 October 1931, he left on his camel towards the Saudi Arabian border spending the night in the vicinity of the Haql oasis. The next day he was attacked by a local Bedouin tribe on the road between al-Haql and Humayda. He managed to escape overnight, but was found the next day and shot on 13 October 1931. The circumstances of his death were never fully explained. While it has been speculated that Italian intelligence ordered the murder, this claim has never been verified.

== Works ==
- Between the Devil and the Deep Sea: a Dash by Plane to Seething Morocco (published in English 1924)
- Desert Encounter, 1931 (Darf Publishers)
