= Mostafa Chendid =

Moroccan-Danish imam

Mostafa Chendid is a Moroccan born Imam. He received Danish citizenship in 2002.

Chendid, a former taxi-driver, is a member of the Islamic Society in Denmark where he functions as the spiritual tutor. He is thought to be Ahmad Abu Laban's successor.
