= Family reunification =

Family process

Family reunification is the process where a divided family can unite in one country.

In some countries family reunification laws try to balance the right of a family to live together with the country's right to control immigration. How they balance and which members of the family can be reunited differ largely by country.

A subcategory of family reunification is marriage migration in which one spouse immigrates to the country of the other spouse. Marriage migration can take place before marriage and then falls under its own special category, or it can take place after marriage and then falls under family reunification laws. Some countries allow family reunification for unmarried partners if they can prove an ongoing intimate relationship that also lasted longer than a certain period of time.

In recent years, several minors went on hazardous journeys to apply for political asylum status and enable their families to join them. In some countries, applicants must be at least 18 and can only reunify with dependant children under 16 or partners, not with parents or siblings.

== Europe ==
A major part of immigrants to Europe do so through family reunification laws. Many countries in Europe have passed laws in recent years to limit people's ability to do so.

=== Denmark ===
In the case of marriage, Danish law requires both spouses to be at least 23 1/2 years old. This is known as the 24-year rule. Additionally, the couple's connection to Denmark must be stronger than to the country of origin, in practice that the spouse in Denmark must have resided there for 12 years.

=== Germany ===
Since 2007, law requires each spouse to be at least 18 years old. The spouse living in Germany may not be dependent on social benefits and must possess adequate living space. The immigrating spouse needs to prove basic spoken and written knowledge of German language. The law applies to German and foreign citizens.

=== Netherlands ===
In case of marriage, Dutch law requires the Dutch spouse to be at least 21 years old, and to earn a salary of at least 120% the minimum wage. The non-Dutch spouse is required to pass integration exams at the Dutch embassy in their home country, showing a basic mastery of Dutch. Where a law case would take years and thousands of euros, the EU-rules of free movement give right to family life immediately without costs more than that of an identity card. Therefore, some Dutch people move to Belgium or Germany for at least six months, in order to be governed by the EU family unification rules instead of the Dutch family unification rules. This has become known as the "Belgian Route" or "EU Route" or "U-turn".

A so-called Chavez residence permit is based on the Chavez-Vilchez ruling of the European Court of Justice. If some conditions are met, non-EU parents can stay with their minor Dutch child in the Netherlands.

=== Norway ===
The sponsor must have an income of at least NOK 251,856 (US$37,000) pre-tax during 2014 and have earned at least NOK 246,136 in 2013 pre-tax. The reference person cannot have received social security benefits during the last 12 months. The income requirement must be proven to the Norwegian Directorate of Immigration every year.

In 1999, the Norwegian Directorate of Immigration (Norwegian: Udlendingsdirektoratet, UDI) started to use blood testing on Somalis who applied for family reunification with parents, with the tests showing that 1 out of 4 lied about the family ties. The tests were later changed to DNA tests to verify family ties. The leader of a Somali community organization in Norway and the Norwegian Medical Association protested the tests and wished they would be discontinued. In 2010, UDI started DNA-tests on Somali childless couples who applied for family reunification where one spouse already resided in Norway. The results showed that 40% of such pairs were siblings. As the tests became widely known, the ratio dropped to 25% and the tests were widened to migrants from other regions.

According to a 2017 study by Statistics Norway immigrants arriving via family reunification are overrepresented as perpetrators of crime, with 66,9 per 1000 versus 44,9 per 1000 for the non-immigrant population. Refugees and immigrants from Africa also show significant over-representation whereas immigrants who arrive to study are strongly underrepresented at 19.7 per 1000.

=== United Kingdom ===
The Immigration Rules, under the Immigration Act 1971, were updated in 2012 to create a strict minimum income threshold for non-EU spouses and children to be given leave to remain in the UK. Since 2012, the applicant must meet the financial requirement of £18,600 per year if they are applying only for themselves, £22,400 per year for themselves and one child, and £2,400 per year for each additional child. These rules were challenged in the courts, and in 2017 the Supreme Court found that while "the minimum income threshold is accepted in principle" they decided that the rules and guidance were defective and unlawful until amended to give more weight to the interests of the children involved, and that sources of funding other than the British spouse's income should be considered. The Settlement visa approval rate for 2017 was 76%.

== Canada ==
Under the Immigration and Refugee Protection Act and associated Regulations, a Canadian citizen or permanent resident of Canada aged at least 18 is allowed, subject to certain conditions, to sponsor specific members of their immediate family for permanent residence in Canada.

== United States ==
Family reunification is since 1968 governed by the terms of the Immigration and Nationality Act, as amended. It is the most common legal basis for immigration to the United States. Historically, the emphasis on family reunification in American immigration law began in that act by allotting 74% of all new immigrants allowed into the United States to family reunification visas. Those included, in descending preference, unmarried adult children of U.S. citizens (20%), spouses and unmarried children of permanent resident aliens (20%), married children of U.S. citizens (10%), and brothers and sisters of U.S. citizens over age 21 (24%). Since 2016, advocates of more restrictive immigration laws have often criticized family reunification as Chain migration, scholars typically use that term for the broader process by which people from particular towns or regions follow each other to new cities and occupations.

Citizens and permanent residents of the United States may sponsor relatives for immigration to the United States in a variety of ways. Citizens of any age may sponsor their spouses and their children, but only citizens who have reached the age of 21 may sponsor siblings and parents. (The Supreme Court decision United States v. Windsor ruled in 2013 that same-sex spouses must be treated the same as opposite-sex spouses.) Permanent residents may only sponsor spouses and unmarried children. The sponsor must demonstrate the capacity to support their relative financially at 125% of the poverty level.

On 23 December 2017, James Robart, a Senior US District Judge, granted a nationwide injunction that blocks the administration's restrictions on the process of reuniting refugee families and has partially lifted a ban on refugees from 11 mostly Muslim countries.

=== Immigration of parents of adult children ===
Under the Citizenship Clause of the Fourteenth Amendment to the United States Constitution, All persons born or naturalized in the United States, and subject to the jurisdiction thereof, are citizens of the United States and of the State wherein they reside.

Under existing law, parents of United States citizens may be sponsored for immigration by their adult citizen children (those at least 21 years of age) under certain conditions. The child must demonstrate the financial ability to provide for the parents.

=== Immigration of parents of minors ===
There are some 3.1 million United-States-citizen children with at least one illegal immigrant parent as of 2005. At least 13,000 children had one or both parents deported in the years 2005–2007.

Having U.S.-citizen minor children makes a difference in deportation proceedings for non-resident parents. The number of such hardship waivers is capped at 5000 per year.

=== Opposition ===
Opponents of the current family reunification policy generally refer to the policy by the term "chain migration" and argue that the Hart-Celler Act's emphasis on family reunification resulted in a dramatic increase in immigration in general.

According to the Federation for American Immigration Reform (FAIR), an anti-immigration organization designated as a "hate group" by the Southern Poverty Law Center, "chain migration—and the expectations and long lines it produces—increases illegal immigration." FAIR also argues that "illegal aliens given amnesty by Congress in 1986 are now fueling naturalization in record numbers. As these former illegal aliens become citizens, all of their immediate relatives qualify to come immediately to the United States, and start new migration chains of their own." Relatives of new citizens usually do not immediately qualify for immigration to the United States, where strict restrictions on the numbers of reunification visas make the average wait time 18 to 23 years.

Former president Donald Trump tweeted on 1 November 2017: "CHAIN MIGRATION must end now! Some people come in, and they bring their whole family with them, who can be truly evil. NOT ACCEPTABLE!" Melania Trump sponsored her Slovenian parents for permanent residence in the United States, which let them become naturalized citizens in August 2018.

== See also ==
- Anchor baby
- Asylum shopping
- Asylum seeker
- Central American Minors Program
- Chain migration
