= Yildiz Akdogan =

Turkish-Danish politician

Member of the Folketing
- Incumbent
- Assumed office 25 May 2025
- Constituency: Copenhagen
- In office 13 November 2007 – 15 September 2011
- Constituency: Copenhagen
- In office 5 June 2019 – 21 October 2014

Personal details
- Born: 29 April 1973 (age 52) Çorum, Turkey
- Party: Social Democrats

Yildiz Akdogan (born 29 April 1973) is a Turkish-Danish politician serving as a member of the Folketing for the Social Democrats since 25 May 2025, having previously served from 2007 to 2011 and again from 2014 to 2019. Along with Özlem Cekic, she was one of the first female immigrant politicians to be elected to the Folketing.

== Background ==
Akdogan was born in Turkey and was raised by her paternal grandparents for the first five-and-a-half years of her life. Her mother moved to Esbjerg in Denmark shortly after her birth and her father was called up to do military service in Turkey. The family were reunited in 1979, when Akdogan and her father moved to Denmark.

Prior to being elected to the Folketing, Akdogan received an MSc in political science from Aarhus University in 2006. She had previously worked as a journalist for the Danish-Turkish newspaper Haber. She has published widely on social integration and women's rights. Akdogan is a board member and spokesperson for the Democratic Muslims, a network set up in the wake of the Jyllands-Posten Muhammad cartoons controversy.

== Political career ==
Akdogan was elected into parliament at the 2007 Danish general election, but was not reelected in the 2011 election. She received 2,599 votes, which was not enough to win her a seat in parliament. Instead she became the Social Democrats' primary substitute in the Copenhagen constituency. When Karen Hækkerup resigned her seat on 21 October 2014, Akdogan was called upon to take over Hækkerup's seat. Akdogan served the remainder of the term and was reelected in 2015. She failed to win reelection in 2019.

After Pernille Rosenkrantz-Theil resigned her seat to run for Lord Mayor of Copenhagen in the 2025 local elections, Akdogan returned to the Folketing on 25 May 2025 as her substitute.
