= Poultry by-product meal =

Pet food ingredient

Poultry by-product meal (PBM) is a high-protein ingredient used as a major component in some pet foods. It is made from grinding clean, rendered parts of poultry carcasses and can contain bones, offal and undeveloped eggs. Poultry by-product meal quality and composition can change from one batch to another.
