= Sherin Khankan =

Danish imam

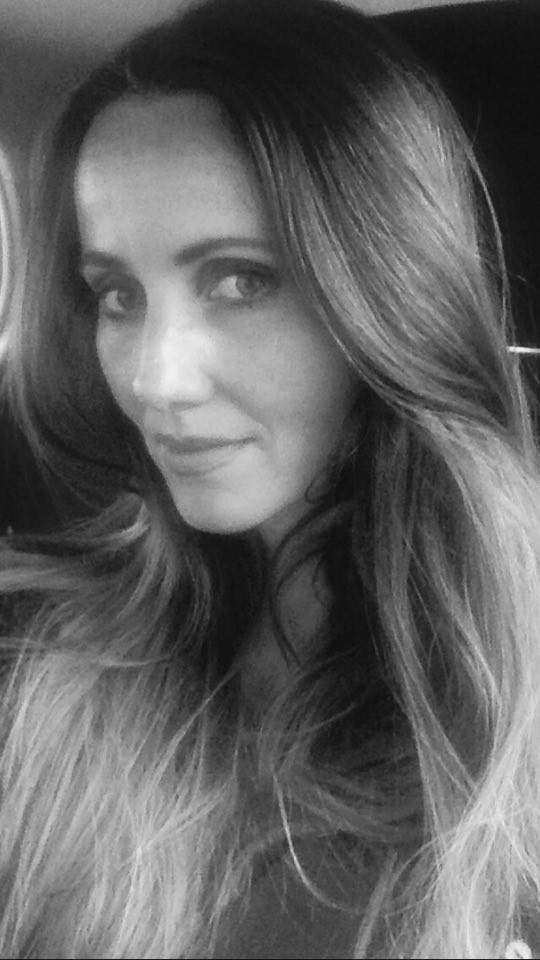
- Born: Ann Christine Khankan; 13 October 1974 (age 51); Denmark
- Occupation: Imam
- Children: 6

Sherin Khankan (born Ann Christine Khankan; 13 October 1974) is Denmark's (and Scandinavia's) first female imam; she founded a women-led mosque in Copenhagen. She is also an activist on Muslim issues including female integration and extremism, and has written numerous texts discussing Islam and politics.

== Early life ==
Khankan was born in Denmark in 1974, to a Syrian father and a Finnish mother. Her father was a political refugee and a feminist. Khankan studied in Damascus and returned to Denmark in 2000. She sees herself as being born between two worlds and considers her goal to reconcile opposites.

She started at the University of Copenhagen in 1992 studying religion supplemented by courses in Arabic. Despite her father's background, Arabic is not her mother tongue. She graduated with a master's degree in Sociology of Religion and Philosophy in 2002.

== Career ==
In February 2016, the Mariam mosque in Copenhagen, Denmark's first female-run mosque, was founded by Khankan; it has only female imams. The mosque is open to male and female worshippers, with the exception of Friday prayers, which are only open to female worshippers. Khankan became Scandinavia's first female imam when she opened that mosque.

Khankan also founded Critical Muslims, an organisation to link religion and politics.

In 2007, she published a book titled Islam and Reconciliation - A Public Matter.

Khankan notes that Christianity, Jewish, and Muslim institutions have become patriarchal, and she sees women-run mosques as a challenge to this tradition. She has had some moderate opposition but, in general, she says the reception has been supportive. The mosque opened in February 2016 and held its first formal service that August. Khankan gave the call to prayer and 60 women gathered above a fast food shop. Another imam, Saliha Marie Fetteh, took the service where she spoke on the subject of women and Islam. The new mosque has conducted several weddings. The mosque marries couples of different religions, which some mosques will not allow.

She stood for parliament as a candidate for the Danish Social Liberal Party.

Khankan was named one of the BBC's 100 Women of 2016.

== Personal life ==
Khankan has two daughters and two sons. She is divorced but married again in 2024 to Elias Benakrich. Together they have 6 children. She was also hosted by Emmanuel Macron in his presidential palace for her advocacy for progressive mosques and feminist imams.

== Bibliography ==
- Women lead Friday prayers at Denmark's first female-run mosque, Harriet Sherwood, 26 August 2016, The Guardian, Retrieved 27 November 2016
- Khankan (right), with Saliha Marie Fetteh and Özlem Cekic [Facebook] Date of publication: 23 September 2016 , 23 September 2016, The New Arab, Retrieved 27 November 2016
- Danmarks første kvindemoske slår dørene op, 10 February 2016, Politiken, Retrieved 27 November 2016
- Women-led mosque opens in Denmark, 12 February 2016, The Guardian, Retrieved 27 November 2016
