= Democratic Muslims in Denmark =

Political organization in Denmark

- Demokratiske muslimer
- Formation: February 2006
- Founder: Naser Khader, Yildiz Akdogan
- Location: Denmark

Democratic Muslims (Danish: Demokratiske muslimer) is a political organization in Denmark founded by Naser Khader, Yildiz Akdogan and other Muslims in February 2006 after the escalation of the Jyllands-Posten Muhammad cartoons controversy. Its goal is a peaceful co-existence of Islam and democracy. Its original name was Moderate Muslims, but they changed their name quickly after being founded.

Naser Khader left his position as leader in 2007. In 2009 and 2011, it was reported that the organization had few members and little activity.
