= Özlem Cekic =

Danish politician

Özlem Çekiç
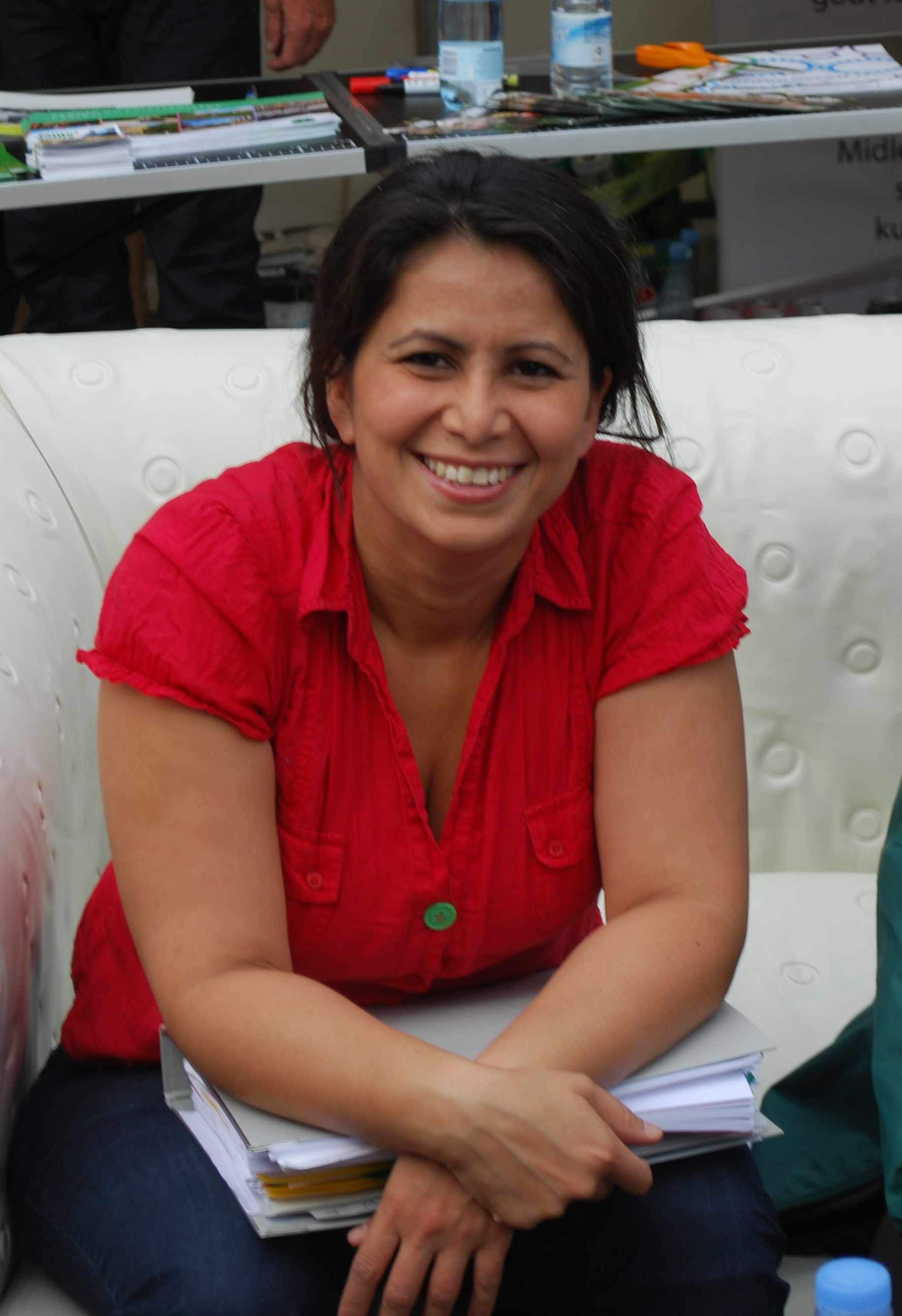
- Özlem Cekic in Valby, Denmark 2011

Member of Parliament
- In office 2007–2015

Personal details
- Born: 7 May 1976 (age 50) Ankara, Turkey
- Party: Socialist People's Party (2001–2016)
- Website: www.ozlem.dk

Özlem Sara Cekic (born 7 May 1976) is a Danish-Kurdish former politician and member of parliament for the Socialist People's Party (SF), who is now general-secretary of the organisation Brobyggerne (the Bridge-builders) - Center for Dialog Coffee. She is also a well renowned author, speaker, advisor and active in the public debate, especially on humanitarian issues.

A nurse by education, Cekic was first elected to the central committee of the Socialist People's Party in 2004. In the 2007 elections, she became a member of the Danish parliament. She was her party's spokesperson for health related issues. She left the party in 2016 due to disagreements regarding refugee policies and is not a member of any party today.

In 2018, she was the second Dane ever to be invited to give a TED talk in New York on her invention - Dialogue Coffee - a new way of meeting and communicating among people, including those who might disagree.

== Early life ==
Born in Ankara, Turkey, from a Kurdish background she arrived in Denmark as a 10-year-old child via several other countries, including Finland, and grew up in Copenhagen's Vesterbro neighborhood.

Cekic was the first in her family to seek an education. She graduated from High School in 1996 and finished her Nursing Education in 2000. She then worked at various hospitals including at the neopaediatric ward at Rigshospitalet, and several psychiatric positions working with traumatised refugees and immigrants at Sankt Hans Hospital and abusers at street level at the child and youth ward of Bispebjerg Hospital.

During this period, she became the first board member from a minority background of a Danish Nursing Faculty (sygeplejeraad). She also set up the Diversity Network which worked to highlight the discrimination that Danes with a different ethnic background received in the Danish Health Service.

At 20, she entered a marriage arranged by her parents, but at age 26 she decided to divorce and rear her child alone. She was encouraged by her maternal grandmother who told her that she should strive never to be dependent on anybody, least of all on men. She remarried in 2006 with a Kurdish man and has a further 2 children. Cekic is a Muslim who believes in the separation of religion from politics.

== Political career ==
Çekiç joined SF after the election in 2001. She stood for the first time in 2005 and got 168 personal votes. In 2007 she was elected as the first Muslim woman and the first immigrant with 4533 personal votes which increased in 2011 to 5383 and 2015 to 6542 personal votes. However even if she was the second highest vote taker in her party, she lost her seat in 2015 due to the bad performance overall by the party.

During her time in Parliament, Cekic was the party's lead spokesman on many different issues including health, culture, social issues and equality. As such she participated in select committees in these areas as well as Foreign Affairs. She chaired the Parliament Social Select Committee for 2 years. She was also a member of the Danish delegation to the Parliamentary Assembly of the Council of Europe from 2013 to 2015.

In 2012 Çekiç decided to vote against the tax reform proposed by her own party in collaboration with the Social Democrats. Cekic argued that the reform was socially lopsided, reallocating funds from the socially marginalized to the upper and middle class, saying that "I oppose the part of the agreement that takes money from people on disability pensions, social security and early pensions to give tax reductions to the rich." The party leadership requested that she vote with the party line, but she refused and consequently lost her posts as spokeswoman for Social Policy, gender equality and housing although she remained a member of the party. After Annette Vilhelmsen became the new party leader in September 2012, Cekic was given the post as spokesperson on health related issues. In August 2013, she also became spokeswoman for gender equality again.

In 2015 during a public debate Çekiç was told by the Chairman of the "Danish Party", Poul Madsen that it was time she got sent back to Turkey!

After losing her seat in 2015 she started looking into how she could convert the huge personal support she had to better use outside parliament and despite being offered a "safe" seat to return to parliament by the party, she decided that her new work building bridges between people and various groups of people was more important and rewarding, so she declined the offer and left party politics for good. In March 2017 she also left SF as a member after the party decided to support a proposal closing the door completely for unaccompanied refugee children. This was simply one step too far for Cekic to continue to be associated with that party.

In 2009 she published the autobiographical book 'Fra Føtex til Folketinget' (Gyldendal) [English: "From Føtex to Parliament"], in which she recounted her experiences as a politically progressive Muslim woman from a working-class background. Among her experiences of discrimination in Danish society she recounts how her teacher told children with immigrant backgrounds that "it is incredible to see how much you struggle, while knowing that you'll never achieve anything", and how the Danish midwife who refused to address Cekic by name even once during her 23-hour labor, because it was "too hard to pronounce". Cekic also tells how she got in trouble during her years in the Nurse's Union, when she criticized the fact that the union leader's salary was higher than that of the Danish prime Minister.

In the 2015 Danish general elections, the Socialist People's Party (SF) lost 9 of its 16 seats in parliament and Cekic was not re-elected.

In 2024, Özlem Çekiç's brother, Cemal Çekiç, was sentenced to be deported from Denmark for crimes involving rape, drug dealing, extortion and severe violence.
