= Timeline of the Jyllands-Posten Muhammad cartoons controversy =

The Jyllands-Posten Muhammad cartoons were first published by Jyllands-Posten in late September 2005; approximately two weeks later, nearly 3,500 people demonstrated peacefully in Copenhagen. In November, several European newspapers re-published the images, triggering more protests.

Labour strikes began in Pakistan the following month, and several organizations criticized the Danish government. More protests occurred in January 2006, and later that month a boycott of Danish goods began. Comedian Omar Marzouk ridicules Muhammad as he defends freedom of speech. Several countries withdrew their ambassadors to Denmark, and widespread protests, some of them violent, began. The protests continued in February. In Damascus, Syria, both the Norwegian embassy and a building containing the Danish, Swedish, and Chilean embassies were stormed and set on fire by protesters. In Beirut, thousands of people protested on the streets, and the Danish General Consulate was stormed and set on fire. As of February 2006, at least 139 people have died primarily during riots stemming from protests, with higher estimates being close to 250. On 1 January 2010, a man was shot whilst attempting to kill Kurt Westergaard, one of the original cartoonists.

== 2003 ==
=== April ===
Jyllands-Posten denied an unsolicited submission that caricatured the resurrection of Jesus, with the reason that they were not funny, and would "offend some readers, not much but some".

== 2005 ==
=== September ===
- Flemming Rose, the cultural editor of Jyllands-Posten, commissions twelve cartoonists to draw cartoons of Islamic prophet Muhammad. This is based upon a motivation explained as stemming from difficulties that Danish writer Kåre Bluitgen had finding artists to illustrate his children's book about Muhammad. Artists in Denmark have been reluctant to provide these images due to a fear of assassinations by Islamists as journalist Troels Pedersen wrote in an article for the Danish news agency Ritzaus Bureau.

==== 30 September ====
- The cartoons are printed in the Danish daily newspaper, Jyllands-Posten, accompanied by an editorial text in Danish stating that Muslims are like any other religious group and will have to put up with insults, mockery, and ridicule.

=== October ===
==== 14 October ====
- Up to 5,000 people stage a peaceful demonstration outside the Copenhagen office of Jyllands-Posten.
- Two of the cartoonists are advised to go into hiding after receiving death threats.

==== 17 October ====
- Egyptian newspaper El Fagr publishes six of the cartoons during Ramadan along with an article strongly denouncing them. The publication of the images does not provoke any known protests from either Egyptian religious authorities or the Egyptian government.

==== 19 October ====
- Ambassadors from ten Muslim countries request a meeting with the Prime Minister of Denmark, Anders Fogh Rasmussen, to ask him to distance himself from the cartoons in Jyllands-Posten as well as various other allegedly derogatory comments about Islam in the Danish media. The Prime Minister refuses to meet the ambassadors, on the grounds that he cannot infringe on the freedom of the press.

==== 28 October ====
- A number of Muslim organizations file a complaint with the Danish police claiming that Jyllands-Posten had committed an offence under section 140 and 266b of the Danish Criminal Code.

=== November ===
==== 3 November ====
- The German newspaper Die Welt publishes one of the cartoons.
- The Bosnian newspaper Slobodna Bosna publishes the cartoons.

==== 7 November ====
- The Bangladeshi government issues a diplomatic protest to the Danish government following the initial publication of the cartoons.

==== 24 November ====
- The United Nations Special Rapporteur on freedom of religion or belief and Special Rapporteur on contemporary forms of racism, racial discrimination, xenophobia and related intolerance request the Permanent Danish Mission to the UN to deliver their observations of the case

=== December ===
==== 2 December ====
- A Pakistani political party, Jamaat-e-Islami apparently offers a roughly $10,000 reward to anyone who kills one of the cartoonists. It was later discovered that this was a considerable exaggeration, based on a small note in a local newspaper, citing Jamaat-e-Islami as promising a reward up to a million rupees for the deaths of the cartoonist. Jamaat-e-Islami claims to be wrongly cited, having merely suggested that the Pakistani government could promise such a reward. On its way through the Danish ambassador to the Danish media, this fact is exaggerated as involving multiple papers and flyers with the reward.

==== 5 December ====
- The first delegation of five Danish Imams, headed by Abu Bashar of The Community of Islam, landed in Egypt on 3 December 2005 and returned 11 December 2005. Among the people the group met on their visit to Egypt were: The General Secretary of the Arab League Amr Moussa, the Egyptian Grand Mufti Ali Gomaa, the grand imam of Al-Azhar university Muhammad Sayyid Tantawi and Muhammad Shaaban, an advisor to the Egyptian Foreign Minister. This meeting was arranged by Egypt's ambassador to Denmark, Mona Omar.

==== 6 December ====
- At a 6 December 2005 summit of the OIC, with many heads of state in attendance, the dossier was handed around by the Egyptian foreign minister Ahmed Abul-Gheit on the sidelines first, but eventually an official communiqué was issued.

==== 7 December ====
- Labour strikes begin in Pakistan in response to the cartoons.

==== 17 December ====
- The second Danish Imam delegation, headed by Sheik Raeed Huleyhel, traveled to Lebanon and returned to Denmark 31 December 2005. In Lebanon they met the Grand Mufti Muhammad Rashid Kabbani, top Shiite Sheikh Muhammad Hussein Fadlallah, Maronite Church leader Nasrallah Sfeir. During that time, Imam Ahmed Akkari also visited Syria to present their case to Grand Mufti Ahmed Badr-Eddine Hassoun. Furthermore, a smaller delegation traveled to Turkey while individuals visited Sudan, Morocco, Algeria. and Qatar, where Abu Laban briefed Sheikh Yusuf al-Qaradawi of the Muslim Brotherhood.

==== 19 December ====
- Twenty-two former Danish ambassadors criticize the Prime Minister of Denmark for not meeting with the eleven ambassadors in October.
- The Council of Europe criticises the Danish government for invoking the "freedom of the press" in its refusal to take action against the "insulting" cartoons.

==== 29 December ====
- The Arab League criticizes the Danish government for not acting in the matter.

== 2006 ==
=== January ===
==== 1 January ====
- The Prime Minister of Denmark makes his yearly New Year's speech, where he says: "I condemn any expression, action or indication that attempts to demonise groups of people ..."

==== 6 January ====
- The Regional Public Prosecutor in Viborg decides to discontinue the investigation of whether Jyllandsposten had committed an offence under section 140 (publicly ridiculing or insulting dogmas of worship of any lawfully existing religious community in Denmark) and 266b (dissemination of statements or other information by which a group of people are threatened, insulted or degraded on account of e.g. their religion) of the Danish penalty law because there was not a reasonable suspicion that a criminal offence indictable by the state had been committed and "the right to freedom of speech must be exercised". The original claim was filed on 27 October 2005.

==== 7 January ====
- Two pictures are printed in the Swedish newspaper Expressen and its sister editions Kvällsposten and GT.

==== 10 January ====
- The Norwegian newspaper Magazinet publishes all 12 of the cartoons.

==== 23 January ====
- The Danish government delivers its official response to the UN Special Rapporteurs' request of 24 November 2005.

==== 24 January ====
- The government of Saudi Arabia issues its first public condemnation of the cartoons.

==== 26 January ====
- Saudi Arabia recalls its ambassador from Denmark, and Saudi Arabian consumers begin to boycott Danish products. Consumers in Kuwait and in some of the other Middle Eastern countries soon follow.
- The Norwegian Ministry of Foreign Affairs sends a letter to their ambassadors in the Middle East stating that one of the pillars of Norwegian society is freedom of speech, but they expressed regret that Magazinet did not respect Muslims' beliefs.

==== 27 January ====
- Thousands of people in Iraq use Friday prayers to denounce the cartoons.

==== 28 January ====
- A Danish ambassador in Saudi Arabia is interviewed by the American Associated Press Television News (AP-TV) where he criticises Jyllands-Posten's lack of judgement and knowledge of Islam.
- The Organisation of the Islamic Conference (OIC) states that the Danish government should immediately have condemned the cartoons.
- The Arla Foods (A Swedish-Danish company) places adverts in Middle Eastern Newspapers in an attempt to bring an end to the boycott.

==== 29 January ====
- Libya closes its embassy in Denmark.
- The Danish government announces that Denmark's ambassador to Saudi Arabia only expressed his own opinion in a 28 January interview with AP-TV. The Danish People's Party, Dansk Folkeparti, demands he be reprimanded.
- The Danish ambassador in Jordan is summoned for a hearing.
- The President of Afghanistan Hamid Karzai calls the printing of the cartoons a mistake, and hopes that this will lead to the media being more responsible and respectful in the future.
- The Flag of Denmark is burned in the West Bank cities of Nablus and Hebron.
- Yemen's Assembly of Representatives (Majlis al-Nuwaab) condemns the cartoons.
- The Organisation of the Islamic Conference (OIC) heads to the UN with a resolution that forbids attacks on religious beliefs.
- Bahrain condemns the cartoons.
- Syria condemns the cartoons.
- A new denial-of-service attack on Jyllands-Posten's web site. The first happened on 27 January.
- Palestinian Islamic Jihad Movement gives Danes, Norwegians, and Swedes 48 hours to leave the Gaza Strip.
- Al-Aqsa Martyrs' Brigades gives Danes and Swedes 72 hours to leave the area.
- A poll from Epinion for Danmarks Radio, the national broadcasting company of Denmark, showed that of 579 Danes asked, 21% believe that the Prime Minister of Denmark should apologise to the Muslims, with 52% citing that would not be political interference with the freedom of press, while 44% thought the Prime Minister should try harder to resolve the controversy. 38% of those asked believed that Jyllands-Posten should apologise, and while 58% did feel that while it was the right of Jyllands-Posten to publish the cartoons, they could understand the Muslim criticism.
- Boycott of Danish foods begins in Qatar

==== 30 January ====
- Jyllands-Posten sends out an apology in both Danish and Arabic. Apologising, not for the printing of the cartoons, but for hurting the feelings of Islamic society.
- The Mexican newspaper La Crónica reprints the Danish cartoons.
- Armed Palestinians from Fatah take over an EU office as a protest against the cartoons.
- The Prime Minister of Denmark says that he personally distances himself from the cartoons, but reiterates that the government cannot intervene in what the media writes.
- The European Union backs Denmark, saying that any retaliatory boycott of Danish goods would violate world trade rules.
- The Danish Red Cross says that it will evacuate some workers in Yemen and the Gaza Strip after receiving threats.
- Jyllands-Posten sends out a second open letter, this time in Arabic, Danish, and English, trying to clear up several misunderstandings, and once again apologising for hurting the feelings of the Islamic society.
- An Iraqi militant Islamic organisation, the Mujahideen Army, calls for terror strikes against Danish and Norwegian targets.
- Gunmen from al-Aqsa Martyrs' Brigades storm the European Union's office in Gaza and threaten to kidnap the workers unless they receive an official apology for the cartoons from the EU.

==== 31 January ====
- Following a live televised interview on al Jazeera, it is reported that the "apology for any offence caused" made at the opening of the interview by Flemming Rose, Jyllands-Posten's cultural editor, was not translated into Arabic.
- The Danish Muslim Association is satisfied with yesterday's apologies from Jyllands-Posten and the Prime Minister, and say they now will help improve the situation. They claim to be deeply sorry and surprised the case got this far.
- A bomb threat against Jyllands-Posten leads to evacuation of two offices in Aarhus and Copenhagen.
- al-Aqsa Martyrs' Brigades denies that the threat against Scandinavians is real.
- The foreign ministers of seventeen Islamic nations renew demands for the Danish government to punish the authors of the cartoons and to "ensure that it doesn't happen again."
- The Prime Minister of Denmark, Anders Fogh Rasmussen, holds a press conference in both Danish and English in which he repeats that he urges Danes not to take any action that could worsen the situation. He urges Muslims in Denmark to take actions that can improve the situation. He also repeats that freedom of speech is a vital part of the Danish society and that the Danish government is not in a position to have any influence on what the press is printing. He states that he wants to come back to a situation of dialogue, based on the friendship that has existed for a long time between Denmark and the Muslim world. The prime minister is asked by the TV broadcaster Al Jazeera to appear in a program, but has not yet decided whether he will accept.
- The National Assembly of Bahrain demands an apology from Denmark's head of state, Queen Margrethe II, as well as from the government. If the demands are not met, they will urge an official boycott of Danish goods and the cutting off of oil exports of 159,000 barrels per day (25,300 m^{3}/d), in association with other GCC members.
- Hamas leader Adnan Asfour demands that Denmark punish the twelve artists and Jyllands-Posten.
- Former US President Bill Clinton states that he fears antisemitism will be replaced with anti-Islamic prejudice and condemns "these totally outrageous cartoons against Islam".
- Russian president Vladimir Putin indicates in a speech in the Kremlin that the Danish political authorities are using the theme of freedom of expression to protect those who have insulted the Muslims.
- The Icelandic newspaper DV publishes six of the twelve cartoons.
- The German newspaper die tageszeitung publishes two of the cartoons.
- In Greece Eleftherotipia publishes one of the cartoons.
- al Jazeera broadcasts a speech from Danish-based leader of the Muslim Brotherhood Muhammed Fouad al-Barazi, in which he tearfully describes Danish plans to burn the Quran, leading to worldwide outrage.

=== February ===
==== 1 February ====
- The French newspaper France Soir publishes the cartoons, adding one of their own. Managing director Jacques Lefranc is fired later the same day by owner Raymond Lakah, a French-Egyptian binational and Roman Catholic (the chief editor, Serge Faubert, is not fired). The French Government dissociates itself from the initiative.
- The German newspaper Die Welt publishes some of the cartoons, as do the German newspapers Tagesspiegel and Berliner Zeitung.
- The Italian newspaper La Stampa publishes the cartoons.
- The Spanish newspaper El Periódico de Catalunya publishes the cartoons.
- The Dutch papers Volkskrant, NRC Handelsblad, and Elsevier publish the cartoons.
- The Danish embassy in Syria is evacuated because of a hoax bomb threat.
- The Finnish Minister of Foreign Affairs criticises the Danish government for its slow actions on the matter.
- The Russian Orthodox Church and the Muftiat condemned the European newspapers that republished the cartoons.
- Chechen warlord, politician, and leader Shamil Basayev condemns the cartoons.
- Jyllands-Posten's headquarters as well as its office in Copenhagen is again evacuated after a bomb threat.
- An influential Muslim organization in Malaysia, the Muslim Consumers Association of Malaysia, calls on the Malaysian government to protest the cartoons with the Danish government.
- A spokesman from the Indonesian Foreign Ministry condemns the cartoons, saying that freedom of expression should not be used as a pretext to insult a religion.
- Boycott of Danish goods is instituted by Omani retail chains.

==== 2 February ====
- German newspaper Die Zeit publishes one of the cartoons on page five.
- The Prime Minister of Denmark appears on the TV station Al-Arabiya. The recording was made 1 February.
- The Jordanian newspaper al-Shihan prints the cartoons. The newspaper's manager is fired.
- The American newspaper New York Sun publishes two of the cartoons.
- The Belgian newspaper Le Soir publishes two of the cartoons.
- The French newspaper Le Monde publishes a cartoon of Muhammad's face formed only from words that read "I may not draw the Prophet."
- The Swiss newspapers Le Temps and Tribune de Genève publish some of the cartoons, as does the Hungarian newspaper Magyar Hirlap.
- The Uruguayan newspaper Terra prints all 12 cartoons.
- The Portuguese newspaper Público publishes one of the cartoons - the most heated one - Muhammad with a bomb on his head.
- The Argentine newspaper Página/12 publishes the cartoon featuring Muhammad with a bomb on his head.
- The director of the Sakharov Museum in Moscow, Yuri Samodurov says in the 25th Hour TV Program, that the museum will do an entire exhibition about the cartoons. Furthermore, he wants to illustrate the new Russian edition of Salman Rushdie's Satanic Verses with the original Danish cartoons.
- The Ministry of Foreign Affairs of Denmark advises Danish citizens to leave Gaza.
- Mullah Krekar, alleged leader of Ansar al-Islam and living in Norway, calls the cartoons a "declaration of war" and says that "[we] Muslims are ready for this".
- "Fleeting glimpses" of some of the cartoons are shown in British television news programmes on the BBC, ITV and Channel 4. On its flagship current affairs programme Newsnight, the BBC recreates portions of the cartoons but with the image of Muhammad edited out of the scenes.
- In a joint statement, the Roman Catholic bishops of the five Nordic countries deplore the publication of the cartoons. "Again and again, in our Nordic area, it seems that certain opinion makers feel that they are wholly free to say what they wish without any respect for the understanding and beliefs of other people (..) Our sympathies go out to our Muslim sisters and brothers".
- Gunmen from Al-Aqsa Martyrs Brigades storm the European Union's office in Gaza for the second time in a week and kidnap a German national. He is later released unharmed.
- Palestinian gunmen shut down the EU headquarters in Gaza, in protest of the Jyllands-Posten cartoons. According to CNN, "Masked members of the militant groups Palestinian Islamic Jihad and Al Aqsa Martyrs Brigades, the armed wing of the Palestinians' former ruling party, Fatah, fired bullets into the air, and a man read the group's demands....The gunmen left a notice on the EU office's door that the building would remain closed until Europeans apologize to Muslims, many of whom consider the cartoons offensive."
- The NewsHour with Jim Lehrer on PBS displays some of the cartoons in its segment on the issue.
- British Islamist group Al Ghurabaa publishes an article entitled Kill those who insult the Prophet Muhammad, justifying such action using the Qur'an and Hadith, and applying its argument primarily to Jyllands-Posten, Magazinet and to the Danish and Norwegian governments.
- Protesters in Rabat, Morocco stage a sit-in before the Parliament in response to the cartoons. On the same day, delivery of the Wednesday issue of the 'France-Soir' and Friday issue of the 'Liberation' daily newspapers was barred by the Moroccan government.
- Danish company Arla Foods reports millions in losses from boycotts.
- British National Party publishes cartoons at their web page
- Hassan Nasrallah, the leader of the Shiite militant group Hizbullah, says "If there had been a Muslim to carry out Imam Khomeini's fatwa against the renegade Salman Rushdie, this rabble who insult our Prophet Muhammad in Denmark, Norway and France would not have dared to do so".

==== 3 February ====
- Danish Prime Minister Anders Fogh Rasmussen meets with several Muslim ambassadors in Copenhagen. Egyptian ambassador responds that Rasmussen's response is inadequate and that Denmark should try harder to 'appease the whole Muslim world'.
- At the Danish embassy in Jakarta, Indonesia an angry mob demands access to the embassy, and upset lamps and furniture in the lobby in the process. The ambassador talks to the leaders of the demonstration, and the group disperses.
- The Belgian newspaper De Standaard publishes the cartoons. Another Belgian newspaper, Het Volk, prints cartoons of Muhammad by Flemish cartoonists and quotes Etienne Vermeersch as saying Belgian papers should publish such caricatures every week "so that Muslims can get used to the idea."
- The South Korean newspaper OhMyNews prints the cartoons.
- The weekly New Zealand newspaper National Business Review prints one of the cartoons.
- The Times of India prints the 12 cartoons. Muslims start burning copies of the paper.
- British Foreign Secretary Jack Straw praises the British media for not publishing the cartoons and condemns the decision of the European newspapers who brought the cartoons as "disrespectful".
- The Costa Rican newspaper Al Día publishes the cartoons.
- In Honduras El Heraldo prints the cartoons.
- Australian TV broadcasters Special Broadcasting Service (SBS) and the Australian Broadcasting Corporation (ABC) show images of some of the cartoons in their evening news bulletins.
- The Belgian Muslim Executive, of which some former members have been linked to terrorism, strongly condemns the cartoons as "an unacceptable attack on Islam".
- Islamist demonstration outside Danish Embassy in London. Hundreds of Muslims march from the London Central Mosque to the heavily protected Danish embassy. Chants include "7/7 is on its way" and placard slogans include "Slay [also "butcher", "massacre" and "behead"] those who insult Islam", "Free speech go to hell", "Europe is the cancer and Islam is the cure", "Exterminate those who slander Islam", "Europe you will pay. Your 9/11 is on its way!!" and "Be prepared for the real holocaust!"
- The controversial Danish imam Ahmad Abu Laban and the editor of culture of Jyllands-Posten meet on the BBC program HARDtalk.
- A US Department of State spokesman stated "We all fully recognize and respect freedom of the press and expression but it must be coupled with press responsibility. Inciting religious or ethnic hatreds in this manner is not acceptable."
- Newly elected Hamas organizes protests and demonstrations in the Palestinian territories. Demonstrations are significantly more violent than in previous days.
- The Senate of Pakistan adopted a unanimous resolution condemning the Danish newspaper for publishing blasphemous and derogatory cartoons.
- Saudi cleric Sheikh Badr bin Nader al-Mashar refers, in an audio message posted online, to the cartoon furore as "part of the war waged by the decadent West against the triumphant Islam" and issues a call "to the billion Muslims: where are your arms? Your enemies have trampled on the prophet. Rise up."
- Canada's CTV television network news broadcasts a brief static close up of the cartoons.
- Judge Mohammed Jajbhay pre-emptively bans the publication of the cartoons in South Africa following a request for an urgent interdict by the Muslim Jamiat-ul Ulama Transvaal organization. This move is widely criticized by opposition political parties and journalist organizations.
- Islamic retailer Ziyad Brothers suspends business with Arla Foods.
- Belgian newspaper La Libre Belgique prints a game in which people have to connect the dots in order to find the image of Muhammad
- Colonel Gintaras Ažubalis, the Commander of the Lithuania-led Ghor Provincial Reconstruction Team, Afghanistan, took decision that Danish mobile communications and surveillance group will not implement any tasks during the period 3 February-8, according to BNS. Also the number of operations was diminished by Danish battalion in Iraq peacekeeping mission where near 50 Lithuanians served.

==== 4 February ====
- The daily New Zealand newspaper The Dominion Post prints the cartoons and an accompanying article.
- The Polish newspaper Rzeczpospolita publishes the cartoons, much like the most influential Czech daily MF DNES.
- The editor of the Jordanian newspaper al-Shihan, Jihad Momani, was arrested.
- Islamist demonstration outside Danish Embassy in London continues with organisation from Hizb ut-Tahrir. Building student Omar Khayam, 22, from Bedford, was photographed wearing a garment resembling a 7 July 2005 London bombings type suicide bomber's jacket outside the embassy. A speaker calls on "the governments of the Muslim world to completely sever all contact with European governments" until they had "controlled the media". Police later say that two men were arrested near the embassy during the protest. "They were arrested to prevent a breach of the peace, after a search by officers found leaflets including cartoons of the prophet Muhammad," a Metropolitan Police Service spokeswoman said.
- The building which houses the Chilean, Swedish, and Danish embassies in Damascus, Syria, is set on fire after being stormed by angry mob. The Swedish and Chilean embassies were very badly damaged, but the Danish embassy, which is located on the 3rd floor, was only partially damaged. As a response to this incident, the Danish Ministry of Foreign Affairs issued a warning urging Danish citizens in Syria to leave the country immediately. The Danish ambassador had asked the Syrian government for proper protection of the embassy before the attack. Danish government does not rule out severing diplomatic ties with Syria.
- The Norwegian embassy in Damascus is attacked and set on fire. The Norwegian Minister of Foreign Affairs, Jonas Gahr Støre, advises all Norwegians to leave Syria. Støre told the media that he sees the situation as a very serious diplomatic crisis and threatens to sever the diplomatic ties with Syria.
- Several demonstrations in Hillerød, Denmark collide and become violent. One demonstration was arranged by a small nationalistic group and included at least one neo-Nazi. Other groups represented were Muslims, Danish anti-racists, and a group well known to the police for becoming violent (named autonome). 162 people were arrested. Around 110 were demonstrating against the nationalistic group and the rest were mostly Muslims also demonstrating against the nationalistic group.
- The Holy See says the right to freedom of expression does not imply the right to offend religious beliefs, but also that a government should not be held responsible for actions of a newspaper.
- UN Secretary-General Kofi Annan calls for calm and urges Muslims to accept an apology from the Danish paper that first published the cartoons.
- A new network of Danish Muslims called Moderate Muslims (later renamed Democratic Muslims in Denmark) is founded as a response to the cartoon controversy, with the Danish Muslim member of parliament Naser Khader as one of the founding members. This new network will represent Muslims that focus on freedom of speech, democracy, and positive and peaceful relations between Muslims and non-Muslims.
- An op-ed in The Wall Street Journal reported that "Danish Muslims ... added two particularly inflammatory drawings that had never been published by the paper -- one involved a pig's nose and the other an indecent act with a dog." The pictures are in the Akkari-Laban dossier.
- The US blames Syria for not sufficiently protecting the embassies in Damascus. The White House stated: "We stand in solidarity with Denmark and our European allies in opposition to the outrageous acts in Syria today."
- The president of Iran, Mahmoud Ahmadinejad, orders to cancel contracts with all countries where media have published the cartoons.
- Jyllands-Posten is revealed to be the winner of the annual "Victor prize" given by the newspaper Ekstra Bladet, for defending the freedom of press under heavy pressure.
- The German center of culture in the Gaza Strip was ravaged by demonstrators.
- The Danish newspaper Politiken reveals that Jyllands-Posten in 2003, denied an unsolicited submission that caricatured the resurrection of Jesus, with the reason, that it would lead to an outcry.

==== 5 February ====
- The UK's Shadow Home Secretary David Davis says to the Sunday Telegraph that some of the placards held at the Muslim protest in London on 3 February amounted to "incitement to murder" and protesters should be dealt with firmly by police.
- Iran recalls its ambassador from Denmark and bans journalists from its country.
- The Danish consulate in Beirut, Lebanon is set ablaze during a demonstration. The police arrest many people, almost half of them are from Syria.
- Demonstrators in Lebanon from a demonstration at the Danish consulate cause property damage in Christian neighborhoods of Beirut.
- In a press conference in Copenhagen, Danish Minister of Foreign Affairs Per Stig Møller assures that no Qur'an burnings had taken place in Denmark, and urged all parties to "talk down the crisis" so that they could "move forward together".
- The Arab European League, a conservative Arab nationalist organization, puts several anti-Semitic cartoons on its website in response to the Danish cartoons.
- The Syrian newspaper Al-Thawra, which is owned by the state, claims that the Danish government is responsible for having the embassy burned down.
- The Iraqi Ministry of Transportation freezes contracts with Denmark and Norway.
- In Brussels, Belgium, thousands of Muslims spontaneously gather and hold a peaceful protest against the cartoons.
- The Lebanese Interior Minister, Hassan Sabeh, announces his resignation in reaction to the torching of the Danish consulate in Beirut, and to the following criticism.
- A peaceful demonstration is arranged for peace, dialogue, and understanding in Copenhagen. Almost 3000 Muslims and non-Muslims participate.
- The US ambassador to Denmark, James P. Cain, says he is pleased major American newspapers have not re-printed the cartoons.
- The Islamic Army, a militant Iraqi group with ties to al-Qaeda, says Danish citizens, and citizens of other countries who have published the cartoons, should be captured and killed.
- The Prime Minister of Norway, Jens Stoltenberg, will formally complain to the United Nations against Syria for its failure to protect the Norwegian embassy in Damascus.
- Charges against the two Jordanian editors that published the cartoon are dropped.
- 500 Muslims protest peacefully against the cartoons in Vienna, Austria.
- At a press conference, the Danish Foreign Minister says that this is no longer about Denmark and the twelve cartoons and it is no longer a crisis between Denmark and Arab Muslim countries. Instead, it is a crisis for Western-Arab cooperation, and has to be solved using international cooperation.
- The Conference of European Rabbis expresses its concern at the publication of the cartoons, which "humiliate and disparage the feelings of Muslims", comparing them to anti-Semitic caricatures.
- Andrea Santoro, a Catholic priest, is murdered on 5 February at the Santa Maria Church in Trabzon, Turkey where he served. A 16-year-old high school student is arrested two days later carrying a 9mm pistol. The student tells police he had been influenced by the Jyllands-Posten Muhammad cartoons controversy.
- More than seven hundred protesters march through the streets of Auckland, New Zealand after four newspapers in New Zealand reprint the cartoons.

==== 6 February ====
- The Ukrainian newspaper Sevodnya publishes the cartoons.
- The Slovenian newspaper Mladina publishes several cartoons
- A protest of approximately 5,000 people is planned in Jakarta, Indonesia at the Danish embassy.
- Approximately 1,000 protesters march for three hours in Paris, France in response to the publication of the cartoons in several European newspapers. French Prime Minister Dominique de Villepin condemned the violence that had occurred internationally in response to the cartoons, but called for tolerance and respect toward other faiths.
- Three dead at Afghan demonstration against the cartoons.
- Danish soldiers in Iraq are shot at while trying to give first aid to 10-15 Iraqi children who were hit by a truck in a traffic accident. The Danish soldiers manage to save some of the children and bring them to a hospital. The Danish army says that this may be a reaction to the cartoons.
- The Ministry of Foreign Affairs of Denmark recommends not spending holidays in the following countries: Egypt, Morocco, Tunisia, Algeria, Libya, Sudan, Oman, United Arab Emirates, Qatar, Bahrain, Jordan, Iran, Pakistan, and Afghanistan. This will affect 3,000 people who already bought their tickets.
- Ahmed Akkari, spokesman for 29 Muslim organisations in Denmark, offers to go on Arab television with Prime Minister of Denmark Anders Fogh Rasmussen in order to explain why it is not the Danish Prime Minister or the Danish Queen who should provide apologies.
- Sterling Airlines A/S, an Icelandic owned low-fare airline based in Copenhagen, stops all flights to Egypt as a consequence of the travel recommendations from the Ministry of Foreign Affairs of Denmark.
- Demonstrators in Indonesia damage the Danish consulate and try to damage the US consulate. At the American consulate, they clash with police, and warning shots are fired.
- The government of Lebanon apologizes to Denmark for not having protected the consulate well enough.
- The embassy of Austria in Tehran, Iran, is attacked by fire-bombs. The firebombs do not catch fire, and shortly afterwards the security forces protect the embassy. Austria is the current chairman of the European Union.
- UK Prime Minister Tony Blair expresses his full support and solidarity with Denmark.
- Secretary General of NATO, Jaap de Hoop Scheffer, expresses his full support for Denmark.
- The Israeli English language newspaper, The Jerusalem Post, prints the drawings, although very small, almost impossible to see.
- Iran stops all trade with Denmark, thereby violating their agreements with the EU.
- The Danish embassy in Indonesia shuts down in order to secure the employees.
- The Danish embassy in Iran is attacked. About 20 firebombs are thrown at the building, but no damage seems to have been done.
- The American ambassador in Denmark repeats in several media that USA supports Denmark and is 100% behind Denmark. He also states that USA is fully behind freedom of speech and would never intervene against media who publishes the cartoons.
- The Grand Mufti of Syria is sorry that the relationship with Denmark has deteriorated, but hopes to restore it as soon as possible. He says that 10,000 people were at the demonstration at the Danish Embassy, but only 10-15 were responsible for burning it down. He says that the Syrian population will rebuild the embassy, even nicer than it was before. It would be a gift to the Danish population. When TV 2 visits him, he gives them a gold plate with citations from the Qur'an as a gift to the Danish people. Syria has officially apologized for not protecting the embassy well enough.
- The Danish Refugee Council, the largest humanitarian aid organisation in Chechnya and supplier of food for 250,000 people in Chechnya and Dagestan, is asked by the government of Chechnya to leave the country, citing the current controversy. The organisation also has problems with delivering humanitarian aid in Sudan.
- Ferial Haffajee, editor of South African newspaper The Mail & Guardian, which reprinted the cartoons, reports receiving threats.
- An Iranian newspaper, Hamshahri, announces a competition for cartoons on The Holocaust, apparently in retaliation to the Jyllands-Posten cartoons.
- Two people die at a protest near the Bagram Air Base. The death toll in Afghanistan is now at five.
- In Somalia, a teenage boy dies after protesters attack police.
- US vice secretary of foreign affairs, Daniel Fried, states that Denmark has nothing to excuse.
- A man in Aarhus, Denmark files charges against Jyllands-Posten both for blasphemizing and, in doing so, harming the country.
- Terry Davis, secretary general of the Council of Europe, says that the publication of the cartoons crossed an ethical line even if it still was legal.
- Danish illustrator Christoffer Zieler reports that in April 2003 he submitted a series of satirical cartoons about the resurrection of Christ to Jyllands-Posten, but they were turned down by the editor, who said "I don't think Jyllands-Posten's readers will enjoy the drawings. As a matter of fact, I think that they will provoke an outcry. Therefore, I will not use them." The cartoons were not solicited by the newspaper.
- Approximately 1,000 protesters marched in Paris, France in response to the publication of the cartoons in several European newspapers.

==== 7 February ====
- In Tehran, Iran, tear gas is used against protesters in front of the Danish embassy.
- Thousands of protesters clash with police and NATO peacekeepers in Afghanistan.

Four demonstrators are killed in an attack on a Norwegian-led military base in Maymana, capital of the Faryab province in western Afghanistan. At least 20 others, among them five Norwegian soldiers, are injured by grenade splinters.

- Thousands of students protest in Egypt and Peshawar, Pakistan. Peaceful anti-Denmark protests also occur in Niamey, Niger, (tens of thousands) Kano, Nigeria (where lawmakers burned Danish flags), Kashmir, Pakistan, and Cotabato, Philippines
- Protest take place in Helsinki, Finland in front of the Danish embassy, around 200 people attend.
- Ali Khamenei, the spiritual leader of Iran, expresses the hypocrisy of Western media in publishing these cartoons during an address, to Iranian air force personnel.
- Nestlé publishes posters denouncing the rumor that any of its products are Danish in origin.
- The defacement of Danish websites by pro-Muslim hackers reaches 578 within 1 week.
- The Prime Minister of Italy, Silvio Berlusconi, asks Turkey to "neutralize fanatics", after the murder of an Italian Roman Catholic priest.
- Amnesty International publishes a statement declaring that Freedom of Speech is not absolute and should be used responsibly.
- The Taliban urge Muslims to declare Jihad over the cartoons.
- After an investigation Danish police come to the conclusion that a story concerning the attack on a hot-dog stand steward by two Turks on 3 February was a fake story.
- A student newspaper editor is suspended for publishing an image of Muhammad. Cardiff University's student union paper Gair Rhydd is the first UK publication to use the image which has caused global protests, and has recalled 8,000 of its copies.
- Approximately 100 demonstrators attack the Norwegian embassy in Tehran, Iran throwing stones and firebombs.
- A couple of Danish Muslim organisations arrange a peaceful demonstration (300 participants) in Aarhus with the motto "In favor of Denmark", in an attempt to make the Muslim world recognize, that Denmark should not be punished.
- US President George W. Bush calls Anders Fogh Rasmussen to confirm that he and the United States support Denmark during this crisis.
- The editorial staff of the alternative weekly New York Press walk out en masse, after the paper's publishers backed down from printing the Danish cartoons.
- The Yemeni government canceled the publishing license of two Yemeni private newspapers, Yemen Observer and Al-Hourriah(freedom), after they published the Danish illustrations depicting Muhammad.
- In Lithuania Respublika prints 4 (or 1 and 9 on 6 February 2006 and 8 February 2006) of the controversial cartoons.

==== 8 February ====
- French weekly newspaper, Charlie Hebdo, publishes the twelve cartoons plus a new cartoon representing Muhammad by French cartoonist Cabu. French Muslim organisations, including the French Council of Muslim Faith (CFCM) and the Grand Mosques of Paris and Lyon had unsuccessfully sued Charlie Hebdo the day before to avoid this publication.
- Former Danish Minister of Foreign Affairs, Uffe Ellemann-Jensen, states that he thinks that the chief editor Carsten Juste of Jyllands-Posten should quit. Uffe Ellemann-Jensen is a member of the same political party Venstre, to which the prime minister also belongs, but is no longer active in politics.
- The organisation Moderate Muslims is to begin a campaign in Arab countries in favor of Denmark. They will use SMS and newspaper advertisements, paid for by their Muslim members only.
- The picture allegedly of Muhammad dressed up as a pig is revealed to be a photo of the "pig-squealing" champion Jacques Barrot in France.
- Muslims demonstrators burn Danish, Norwegian and Croatian flags in Sarajevo, the capital of Bosnia-Herzegovina. This follows the publication of the controversial cartoons in a Croatian weekly on 6 February. The organizer later apologized for the burning flags, stating there were only three men who on their own burned paper flags.
- Veja, Brazil's largest magazine in terms of circulation, publishes three of the original cartoons in both their print edition and on their website.
- The Paraguayan newspaper La Papa publishes several cartoons of Muhammad.
- Administration at the University of Prince Edward Island, Canada, ordered a halt to the on-campus distribution of the student newspaper The Cadre after the cartoons were re-printed in the newspaper. Campus authorities also attempted to seize all 2,000 copies of the edition containing the cartoons.
- Professor Peter March at Saint Mary's University, Canada, is directed by administration there to remove copies of the cartoons that he posted on his office door. The professor was later the subject of an on-campus student march, and claimed to have received anonymous messages stating that his actions may have repercussions for Canadians being held hostage in Iraq.
- On 8 February Flemming Rose the cultural editor for Jyllands-Posten told CNN: "My newspaper is trying to establish a contact with that Iranian newspaper [Hamshahri], and we would run the cartoons the same day as they publish them". Later that day the paper's editor-in-chief said that Jyllands-posten under no circumstances would publish the Holocaust cartoons.

==== 9 February ====
- The Egyptian newspaper El Fagr removes from its website the front page image of its 17 October 2005 edition which included six of the cartoons.
- The Danish tabloid B.T. reports that Bjarne Sørensen, the Danish ambassador to Egypt, has confirmed reports that the cartoons were published in the Egyptian newspaper El Fagr on 17 October 2005.
- The Venezuelan newspaper Últimas Noticias reprints the cartoons from Charlie Hebdo.
- The Russian newspaper Volgograd Gorodskiye vesti prints 1 new cartoon featuring Muhammad.
- After the Japanese government urged newspapers not to print the controversial cartoons, several newspapers do print them, saying that the freedom of speech is absolute and the government should not intervene. The Japanese government does not react to the printing of these cartoons.
- The Daily Illini, the official student newspaper of the University of Illinois, reprints 6 of the cartoons. The paper's top editor responsible for the decision is soon dismissed as the school's administration condemns the action.
- The Swedish newspaper Dagens Nyheter reports that, although the foreign office and SÄPO got Sverigedemokraterna's web site shut down after publishing Muhammad caricatures, they are still available from their youth organisation.
- Demonstrations with up to 700.000 participants continue to be held across the Muslim world.
- The New York Times: "At Mecca Meeting [of the Organisation of the Islamic Conference], Cartoon Outrage Crystallized".

==== 10 February ====
- Ahmad Abu Laban, Islamisk Trossamfund leader in his Friday prayer calls Denmark a nice and tolerant country and calls for the violence to stop. He also openly challenged Islam critic Ayaan Hirsi Ali.
- The editor of the Norwegian Christian newspaper Magazinet, Vebjørn Selbekk, apologizes for the reactions and consequences of the publication of the cartoons. The Norwegian Muslim community accepted his apology and considered the issue closed.
- At a demonstration in Nairobi, Kenya, one demonstrator dies in a stampede.
- According to Reuters, "Kenyan police opened fire at hundreds of people [...], wounding at least one.".
- Spiegel Online (from AP): Molotov-cocktails thrown at French embassy in Tehran.
- Muslims hold the big rallies in Asia.
- In the Republic of Macedonia, both newspapers Vreme and Vest print the twelve cartoons.
- The Danish ambassadors and diplomatic staff in Iran, Syria, and Indonesia leave after receiving threats.
- Muslims hold protests in the Serbian town of Novi Pazar, burning Western flags.

==== 11 February ====
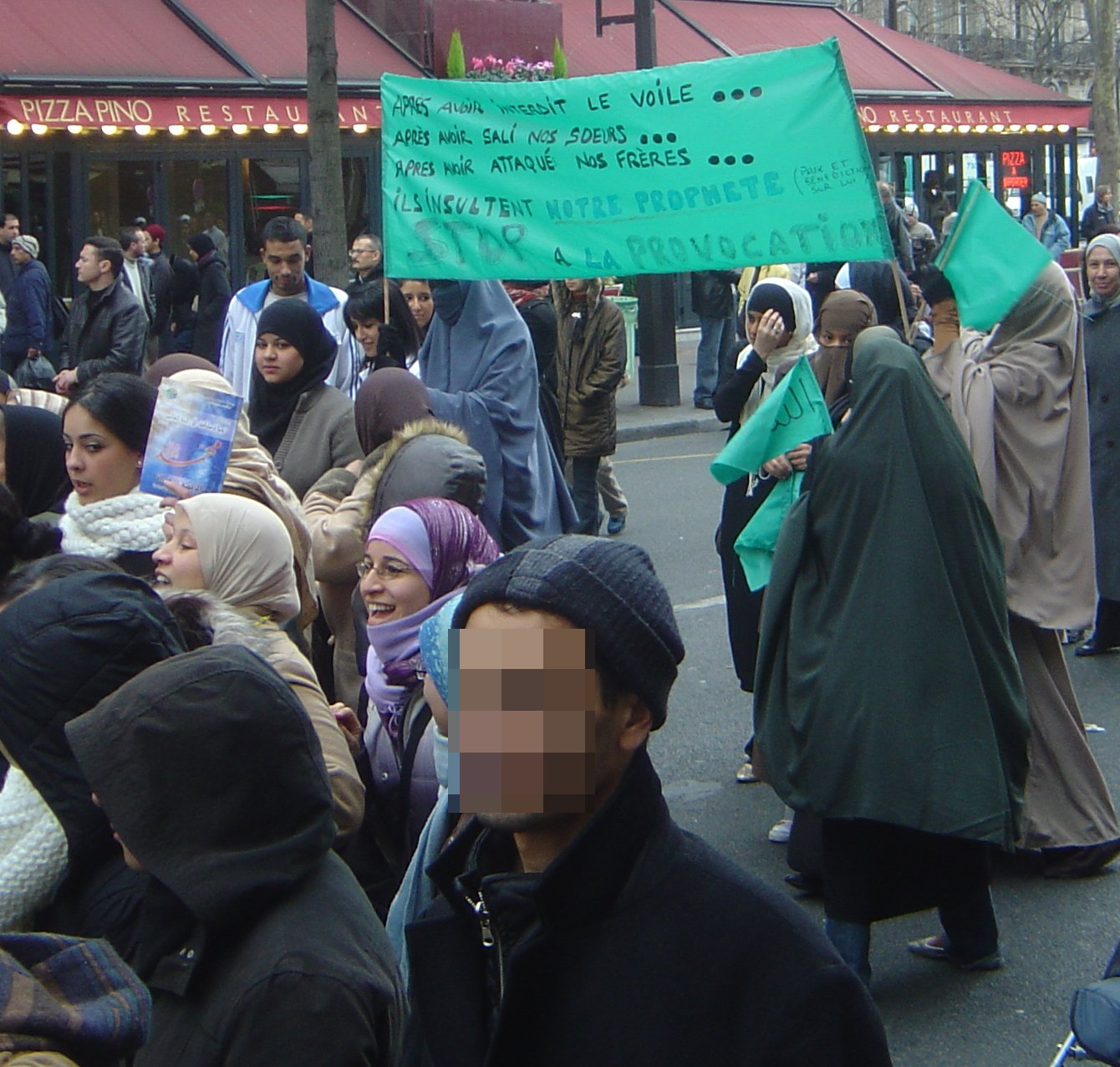
Paris, 11 February 2006, anti-caricature protest banners. The sign reads: "After having forbade the veil, after raping our Sisters, after attacking our Brothers, you insult the Prophet (peace be upon him). Stop the provocation.

- Naser Khader Muslim member of Danish parliament and one of the founding members of Moderate Muslims has asked the Minister of Religion in Denmark to investigate Ahmad Abu Laban's words in the Friday prayer in the mosque at Dortheavej in Copenhagen where Abu Laban described Ayaan Hirsi Ali as a rat in a hole.
- EuroNews shows one of the cartoons in a newstrailer, which was originally from a TV programme from Switzerland.
- The Angolan newspaper Agora prints the cartoons.

==== 12 February ====
- The Irish president Mary McAleese condemned the drawings and concluded "Muslims have every right to feel angry"

==== 13 February ====
- EU foreign policy chief Javier Solana meets with the Organisation of the Islamic Conference's (OIC) Secretary General Ekmeleddin Ihsanoglu to defuse the crisis. Ihsanoglu called upon the EU Parliament to pass legislation to combat Islamophobia: "People in the Muslim world are starting to feel this is a new 9/11 against them".
- A leading Iranian newspaper launches a faux competition asking people to submit cartoons about the Holocaust. The Hamshahri daily says the competition is to test the boundaries of free speech for Westerners. The move is seen as retaliation for the publication in a Danish paper of images satirising Muhammad.
- Australian cartoonist, Michael Leunig, becomes the victim of a hoax involving the cartoon competition Iranian newspaper, Hamshahri.
- About 25 Muslim graves are desecrated in Denmark.
- Mr. Doudou Diène, United Nations Special Rapporteur on contemporary forms of racism, racial discrimination, xenophobia and related intolerance reported:

"Legally, the Government of every State party to the International Covenant on Civil and Political Rights is bound by three articles dealing with the relationship between freedom of religion and freedom of opinion and expression, namely article 18, which protects freedom of religion, subject to such limitations as are necessary to protect public safety and order or the fundamental rights and freedoms of others (art. 18, para. 3); article 19, which protects freedom of expression and opinion, subject to certain restrictions such as "respect of the rights or reputations of others" (art. 19, para. 3 (a)); and article 20, which states that any advocacy of national, racial or religious hatred that constitutes incitement to discrimination, hostility or violence shall be prohibited by law."

==== 14 February ====
- In South America both Peru's RPP Noticias en Chile's 24 Horas print the cartoons.
- Finland's National Bureau of Investigation decides to conduct a preliminary investigation into the matter of the nationalist Suomen Sisu and others publishing the cartoons online. Finnish penal code has the same kind of section on the sanctity of religion as does Danish law.
- In Pakistan, over 1,000 rioters vandalize many western business establishments and torched the provincial assembly building. At least two people are killed.
- The Italian minister Roberto Calderoli wears a T-shirt emblazoned with cartoons of Muhammad. Calderoli (a member of Lega Nord), stated: "I have had T-shirts made with the cartoons that have upset Islam and I will start wearing them today. We have to put an end to this story that we can talk to these people. They only want to humiliate people. Full stop. And what are we becoming? The civilization of melted butter?".

==== 15 February ====
- An Indian sailor is allegedly beaten to death by his colleagues following an argument over the cartoons.
- Protesters in Manila demonstrate outside the Danish Embassy; one placard carried by protesters read, "Behead those who insult Islam."
- The Human Rights Watch NGO champions the freedom of expression case in the Mohammad cartoons issue.

==== 16 February ====
- The European Parliament accepts a resolution which condemns all violence related to the cartoon controversy. It states that the EU stands in solidarity with Denmark and all other countries that have been affected by the violence. Furthermore, it states that Muslims may be offended by the cartoons and that they have the right to protest peacefully. However, the resolution also states that the freedom of speech is absolute and may not be affected by any form of censorship.
- Iranian confectioners union orders Danish pastries renamed "Rose of Muhammad pastries" .
- Approximately 40,000 people take part in a protest in Karachi, Pakistan marching and burning effigies of the Danish prime minister.

==== 17 February ====
- Pakistani cleric Maulana Yousaf Qureshi announces a $1 million bounty (plus a car) for killing the cartoonist who drew Muhammad.
- Minister Yaqoob Qureshi of India's Uttar Pradesh state government offered a reward of $11.5 million to anyone who would kill any of the cartoonists who drew the images of Muhammad.
- A crowd of over one thousand protesters storm the Italian consulate in Benghazi, Libya resulting in at least eleven deaths. Apparently, the protests were triggered by a provocation from the Italian reforms minister Roberto Calderoli, who resigned the day after.
- The Danish and Norwegian embassies in Dar es Salaam, Tanzania closed their offices, fearing a demonstration staged by Muslims in protest against the cartoons. Thousands of Muslim demonstrators staged a peaceful demonstration. The demonstrators issued a 21-day ultimatum to the governments of the two embassies to recant. If the ultimatum was not met, the demonstrators warned, Muslims in Tanzania would boycott all products and services from the two countries and would request the Tanzanian government to cut diplomatic ties with Denmark and Norway.
- A newspaper in Mozambique, Savana publishes 8 of the cartoons.
- Thousands of Muslims in Hong Kong march against the drawings of Muhammed.

==== 18 February ====
- Stockholms Fria Tidning publishes their own "Muhammad pictures", including Muhammad Ali, Muhammad Baqir al-Sadr, Mohammad Lawal, Haji Kher Muhammed, Muhammad Mahdi al-Salih and Amir Mohammed Rasheed.
- Italian Minister Calderoli resigns after pressures from Prime Minister Berlusconi resulting from protests in Libya. Vice-Prime Minister Fini announces a visit to Rome's main mosque.
- Protest march in Copenhagen arranged by a network of Muslim academics (The network). Approximately 3,000 people take part in a peace march with the message "more dialogue and peace amongst religions, cultures and Muslims". All kinds of nationalities and ages appear to be represented. Placard slogans include "Freedom of speech equals respect" and "Tolerance, not distance".
- Sixteen people are killed in northern Nigeria as demonstrators protested the cartoons by storming and burning Christian churches and businesses.

==== 19 February ====
- Approximately four hundred protesters attempted to storm the gates of the United States Embassy in Jakarta, Indonesia, chanting anti-U.S. slogans and burning American flags.
- The Felicity Party stages a protest with tens of thousands of participants in Istanbul, Turkey.
- Over four hundred protesters are arrested and many others are sprayed with tear gas in an attempt by police to suppress protests in Islamabad, Pakistan.

==== 20 February ====
- Danish newspaper Politiken revealed that the 11 ambassadors in their letter in October, also wanted to express their concerns over current issues regarding Islam. The Danish Prime minister has repeatedly said, that the letter only asked for the government to take action against Jyllands-posten.
- The Pope urges respect for world religion and argues that people should try to avoid harming religious sensibilities

==== 21 February ====
- Christians riot in the city of Onitsha, Nigeria while Muslims riot in the city of Bauchi days after an anti-cartoon riots in Maidugugeri, another Nigerian city. At least 24 people have been killed in the two incidents.
- The Organisation of the Islamic Conference (OIC) denounces cartoons violence and previous calls for the death of Danish cartoonists.
- The Belarusian newspaper Zgoda prints the 12 cartoons, but is closed soon afterwards.
- The Lithuanian Journalists and Publishers Commission for Ethics stated that publications of cartoons of Muhammad did not violate neither Lithuanian law nor the Code of Journalism Ethics. The Commission took the decision that these cartoons do not incite hatred on religious grounds, according to BNS.

==== 22 February ====
- The British National Party in the United Kingdom published the cartoons on their website alongside pictures of the violent demonstrations in London. The move is criticised by the major political parties.

==== 24 February ====
- The editor of the Finnish culture magazine Kaltio, Jussi Vilkuna, is fired after refusing to remove a cartoon involving Muhammad from the magazine's website. This cartoon features a fearful cartoonist trying to discuss the issue with the masked prophet, and Finnish politicians burning Danish flags (referring to the unwillingness of Finnish politicians to give Denmark any support in the issue).
- At least 127 people are killed in Nigeria in clashes between Christian and Muslim mobs following continued protests over the cartoons.

==== 26 February ====
- 25,000 people protest the cartoons in Karachi, Pakistan, shouting slogans such as "Down with the blasphemer," "Death to America," and "End diplomatic ties with European countries." Police arrested dozens of Muslim hardliners to prevent a protest in the Pakistani city of Lahore.

==== 27 February ====
- The European Union (EU) expressed regret on Monday over the cartoons of Muhammad, but condemned violence against European interests.

==== 28 February ====
- Over two hundred students at the University of California, Irvine in Irvine, California protest after the university's College Republicans club decides to display the cartoons as part of a forum on terrorism.
- In Poland the Saint Benedict Foundation starts a campaign, using posters displaying Christian martyrs (amongst whom Andrea Santoro) on trams in the city of Poznań. Muslim communities in Poland condemned the exhibition of the posters. The foundation says it simply states the truth:

We aren't even talking about the prosecution of Christians in Muslim countries, we are simply stating the truth: these people actually suffered because of their beliefs". Furthermore, the Saint Benedict Foundation argues that freedom of religion is non-existent in most Muslim countries and that non-Muslims are still prosecuted in these countries, but we don't mention this on our posters because of the recent cartoon controversy. A tramcompany in Poznan was willing to display the posters on their trams after a buscompany in Warsaw refused it.

=== March ===
==== 1 March ====
- Salman Rushdie, Ayaan Hirsi Ali, Taslima Nasrin, Bernard-Henri Lévy, Irshad Manji, Ibn Warraq are among a dozen writers to have put their names to a statement in a French weekly Charlie Hebdo paper warning against Islamic "totalitarianism". Charlie Hebdo reprinted the cartoons in France earlier on.
- United Nations Relief and Works Agency for Palestine Refugees in the Near East (UNWRA) calls on all Scandinavians to leave the Palestinian areas after they received serious threats against Danish diplomats.
- Danish reaction: "Danish police asks the public to stop sending any more charges against the Muslim community for hurting Denmark. The substance of the case does not change whether we get 5 or 500 letters."
- Palestinian reaction "63% of Palestinians consider violence an appropriate response to cartoons."

==== 2 March ====
- A French satirical newspaper, Charlie Hebdo, wins against the French Muslim Council, which had sought to ban the paper. The paper published the original Muhammad cartoons, plus a few of its own, earlier this year.

==== 3 March ====
- Jyllands-Posten translates and reprints the manifest against Islamism earlier printed in Charlie Hebdo.
- Pakistan censors the internet with a widespread ban on blogs due to the cartoons.

==== 4 March ====
- About 50,000 people, many chanting "Hang those who insulted the prophet," rallied in the southern Pakistani city of Karachi. The protesters burned the Danish flag, hit an effigy of U.S. President George W. Bush with a stick and chanted "Death to America" and "Death to Musharraf." In Turkey, some 20,000 protesters chanting anti-Danish slogans gathered in the eastern city of Erzurum.

==== 15 March ====
- The Director of Public Prosecutors in Denmark agrees with the Local Prosecutor and decides that Jyllands-Posten was not in violation of Danish law.
- Five arrested over London cartoons protest. The demonstration attracted widespread political condemnation at the time and among those calling for prosecutions was the Muslim Council of Britain.

==== 17 March ====
- Danish Muslim organizations file a complaint against Denmark at the United Nations Commission on Human Rights over the affair

==== 20 March ====
- Police in Berlin overwhelm Amer Cheema, a student from Pakistan, as he enters the office building of Die Welt newspaper, armed with a large knife. Cheema admitted to trying to kill editor Roger Köppel for reprinting the Mohammad cartoons in the newspaper. On 1 May 2006, Cheema committed suicide in his prison cell. Cheema's family and Pakistani media claim he was tortured to death. At least 20,000 people attended Cheemas funeral near Lahore.

==== 21 March ====
- The Swedish Minister for Foreign Affairs, Laila Freivalds resigns after an indirect attempt at censoring a website from displaying the cartoons in the middle of February by a civil servant of the foreign department, of which she denied any knowledge. When it became clear that she was fully aware of the incident, the press pressured the government so far that she decided to resign. According to regeringsformen, a part of the Swedish constitution, the government is not allowed to interfere with the freedom of the press. The process by which this was discovered is notable, since the lie was made clear and well known by an internal paper in the government called "Riksdag & Department" whose job is to read all internal writings of the government and departments. Sweden is unusual, perhaps unique, in that all writings of the state are publicly accessible according to the principle of public access.
- The Church in Wales has requested that subscribers of its magazine return all of the copies after one of the cartoons from France Soir were accidentally printed. The church has apologised to the Muslim Council of Wales over this incident.

==== 22 March ====
- An Islamic conference to discuss the consequences of the Jyllands-Posten Muhammad cartoons controversy starts in Bahrain. In attendance are high-profile politicians and clerics, as well as Ahmed Akkari and Raed Hlayhel of the Danish-based Committee for Honouring the Prophet.

==== 29 March ====
- Acting Swedish Foreign Minister Carin Jämtin was not made welcome in Darfur. According to the governor of Darfur due to the Swedish involvement in the Mohammed Cartoons according to press secretary John Zanchi.
- In Tehran, Iranian Revolutionary Guards beat themselves with chains in protest over the cartoons.
- In the US, two of the largest chains of bookstores, Borders and Waldenbooks, refuse to stock the April/May issue of Free Inquiry magazine, containing four of the cartoons, because of fear for the safety of their employees.

==== 30 March ====
- A group of Muslim organizations in Denmark sues Jyllands-Posten claiming the cartoons were defamatory and injurious.
  This lawsuit was dismissed on 26 October.

=== April ===
==== 3 April ====
- Sudan 'blocks' UN top humanitarian official Jan Egeland's trip to Darfur, saying that "in the light of the Danish cartoons row, it would not be sensitive or safe for a Norwegian such as Mr Egeland to visit."

==== 5 April ====
- The US based Comedy Central network airs Cartoon Wars Part I, an episode of the controversial animated series South Park, about the controversy.

==== 10 April ====
- Libya's leader Muammar al-Gaddafi, said on Al-Jazeera that "people who defamed Muhammad were defaming their own prophet, because Muhammad is the prophet of the people in Scandinavia, in Europe, America, Asia and Africa.[...] They should agree to become Islamic in the course of time, or else declare war on the Muslims."

==== 12 April ====
- The US based Comedy Central network airs "Cartoon Wars Part II," an episode of the controversial animated series "South Park." Though the creators wanted to include an image of Muhammad in the episode as part of its message, the network ultimately demanded it censored. The episode also included disrespectful images of Jesus, George Bush and the American flag that were not censored, which the creators have said is meant to highlight the double standard.

==== 24 April ====
- The demands for boycott of Denmark and punishing of the cartoonists are reiterated by Osama bin Laden.

=== May ===
==== 12 May ====
- An Al-Qaeda video calls for "Denmark, Norway and France" to be "destroyed [...] and transformed into a sea of blood"

==== 26 May ====
- Canadian bookstore chain Indigo banned the sale of the magazines Western Standard and Harper's because they reprinted some of the illustrations in the Jyllands-Posten Muhammad cartoons controversy. Indigo, however, did allow an issue of Free Inquiry magazine with some of the same cartoons to be sold in its outlets.

==== 30 May ====
- Two-month jail sentences imposed by a Jordanian court on two journalists, Jihad Momani and Hisham Al-Khalidi, for reprinting cartoons of Muhammad.

=== July ===
==== 31 July ====
- 2006 German train bombing plot. Two suitcase bombs are discovered in trains near the German towns of Dortmund and Koblenz, undetonated due to an assembly error. Video footage from Cologne train station, where the bombs were put on the trains, led to the arrest of two Lebanese students in Germany, Youssef al-Hajdib and Jihad Hamad, and subsequently of three suspected co-conspirators in Lebanon. On 1 September 2006, Jörg Ziercke, head of the Bundeskriminalamt (Federal Police), reports that the suspects saw the Muhammad cartoons as an "assault by the West on Islam" and the "initial spark" for the attack, originally planned to coincide with the 2006 Football World Cup in Germany.

=== September ===
- One year after the publication of the original cartoons, a video surfaced showing members of the Danish People's Party's youth wing engaged in a contest of drawing pictures that insult Muhammad. Publicity surrounding the contest led to renewed tension between the Islamic world and Denmark, with the OIC and many countries weighing in. The Danish government condemned the youths, and those who were depicted in the video went into hiding after receiving death threats. Two weeks into this episode, a Danish artists' group, "Defending Denmark", claimed responsibility for the video and said it had infiltrated the Danish People's Party Youth for 18 months claiming "to document (their) extreme right wing associations". A few days later, a new episode surfaced when a member of the Social-liberal youth movement stated that members of the movement had also drawn pictures of Muhammad during a weekend meeting. Unlike the Danish People's Party Youth's drawings, this episode was not condoned by the youth movement, but was done by individuals.

=== October ===
==== 1 October ====
- The national Norwegian TV-channel, TV2, airs a one-hour documentary about the printing of the Muhammad cartoons, the controversy and the aftermath of them. In the documentary the cartoons appear multiple times. The Norwegian foreign ministry had previously warned embassies that had previously been affected by demonstrations because of the cartoons.

==== 16 October ====
- The United Nations Department of Public Information holds a seminar "Unlearning Intolerance" entitled "Cartooning for Peace: The Responsibility of Political Cartoonists?", to "explore the rights, roles and responsibilities of political cartoonists in promoting peace issues." because "the anger and divisiveness engendered by the publication of the caricature of Prophet Mohammed and the recent controversial exhibit on the Holocaust suggest both a sense of the power and of the necessity of responsibility in the art of cartooning."

==== 26 October ====
- The Danish court dismissed a lawsuit filed by Muslims, saying that "there was no reason to assume that the cartoons were meant to "belittle Muslims".

=== November ===
==== 24 November ====
- In Yemen, Kamal al-Aalafi, editor of the Arabic weekly, Al-Ra'i al-Am, was sentenced to a year in prison for reprinting the cartoons. The sentencing court also ordered that the paper be closed for six months and that al-Aalafi himself not be permitted to write for an equal amount of time. He was subsequently released on bail.

=== December ===
==== 4 December ====
- In Yemen, Mohammed al-Asaadi, editor of the English-language daily, The Yemen Observer, was ordered jailed until he could pay a fine of 500,000 rials (approximately $2500) for reprinting the cartoons.

== 2007 ==
=== January ===
==== 4 January ====
Umran Javed (Birmingham) was found guilty of soliciting murder by having chanted death threat slogans during an anti-cartoon rally at London's Danish embassy. He, and three other young British Muslim men, were later sentenced to between four and six years in prison for their actions and statements during that demonstration.

=== February ===
==== 2 February ====
A student guest editor of one of the several student newspapers of Clare College, Cambridge reprints one of the cartoons in an issue devoted to religious satire. It is only the second student newspaper (and fourth media outlet) in the UK to reprint the cartoons in whole or in part. Widespread student outrage ensues—although the National Secular Society leaps to the editor's defense—and Clare punitively cuts the paper's funding in response the incident, as well as destroying most copies of the newspaper. The editor, against whom Clare initiates disciplinary action, is forced to go into hiding for his safety. Ultimately, the editor was reprimanded and forced to publish an apology.

==== 7 February ====
The French newspaper Libération reprints the Mohammed cartoons anew, to highlight the start of a trial against another French newspaper, Charlie Hebdo, and in support of free speech. The trial was initiated by several major Muslim organizations who sued Charlie Hebdo because of their decision to publish the cartoons in February 2006.

=== March ===
==== 30 March ====
Islamic countries pushed through a resolution of the United Nations Human Rights Council, which "prohibits the defamation of religion". The resolution mentions no religion except Islam. The initiative was brought in the immediate aftermath of the cartoon controversy, and is considered a direct response to it.

=== July ===
==== 13 July ====
A network of Danish Muslim organisations, upon losing a libel court case against the Danish People's Party, threatens a fatwa against Jyllands-Posten unless the paper apologizes.

=== October ===
==== 2 October ====
During the ongoing trial of four terror suspects arrested in Denmark, known as the Vollsmose case, one of the accused testified that Jyllands-Posten culture editor Flemming Rose was the target of a terror bombing the group had planned. According to the suspect, they were considering sending a remote-controlled car packed with explosives into the private residence of the editor. Threats were also allegedly made towards Danish MP Naser Khader, who defended the publication of the cartoons.

== 2008 ==
=== February ===
==== 12 February ====
On 12 February 2008, Danish police arrested three men (two Tunisians and one Danish national originally from Morocco) suspected of planning to assassinate Kurt Westergaard, the cartoonist who drew the Bomb in the Turban cartoon. Shortly afterwards, the Dane was released without charge; the two Tunisians were not charged either, but expelled to Tunisia. Despite this, Westergaard has since been under police protection. He has said he is angry that a "perfectly normal everyday activity [drawing political cartoons] which I used to do by the thousand was abused to set off such madness." The next day, 13 February 2008, Jyllands-Posten, and many other Danish newspapers including Politiken and Berlingske Tidende, reprinted Westergaard's Bomb in the Turban cartoon, as a statement of commitment to freedom of speech. The liberal newspaper Politiken had been critical of the original publication of the cartoons, but reprinted this one now as a gesture of solidarity in the face of a specific threat.

In Denmark, some public disturbances with burnt-out cars and a school set ablaze followed these events, but the police are unsure if it is directly related to the cartoons controversy or the fact that the two Tunisians were subsequently sentenced to deportation without a trial. Other sources claim the riots in the Nørrebro district of Copenhagen, which started before the arrests, were wholly unrelated to the cartoons controversy, and were rather set off by police harassment of ethnic minorities in areas of Copenhagen. Some disturbances had occurred already in the days preceding the arrests. Peaceful demonstrations were held in Copenhagen after Friday prayers, with the flags of Hizb ut-Tahrir prominent.

==== 13 February ====
Several Danish newspapers, including Jyllands-Posten, reprints one of the cartoons as a response to the news of the arrest made the day before.

==== 19 February ====
Egypt banned editions of four foreign newspapers including the New York-based Wall Street Journal and Britain's The Observer for reprinting the controversial Danish cartoons criticizing Muhammad.

=== March ===
==== 20 March ====
A video allegedly from Osama bin Laden threatens the EU over the reprinting of the cartoon.

=== June ===
==== 2 June ====
An attempt to blow up the Danish embassy in Islamabad.

=== October ===
In October 2008, Ekstra Bladet published excerpts from an interview with Taliban spokesman Qari Yousuf Ahmadi saying Danish troops in Oruzgan Province are a "primary target" of the Taliban because of the cartoon issue, adding the Danes would be forced to leave Afghanistan.

== 2009 ==
=== August ===
Officials at Yale University Press decided to expunge reproductions of the cartoons along with all other images of Muhammad from a scholarly book entitled The Cartoons that Shook the World, by professor Jytte Klausen. News of the decision sparked criticism from some prominent Yale alumni as well as from the American Association of University Professors. Yale defended its rationale by saying it feared inciting violence if the images were published. Flemming Rose, the cultural editor who commissioned the cartoons, has described Yale's action as "[giving] in to intimidation... not even intimidation but an imagined intimidation". The images of Muhammad censored by Yale were published in the 2009 book Muhammad: The "Banned" Images.

== 2010 ==
=== January ===
On 1 January 2010, Danish police shot and wounded a man at the home of Kurt Westergaard in Aarhus. Westergaard drew the best known of the cartoons, which depicted Muhammad with a bomb in his turban. The man was described as a 28-year-old Somali linked to the Islamist al-Shabab militia. He reportedly shouted in broken English that he wanted to kill Westergaard, who alerted police after locking himself into a panic room in the house, which was a specially fortified bathroom. Police said that the man was "armed with an axe and a knife in either hand", and broke down the entrance door of the house with the axe. The man attempted unsuccessfully to break down the door of the panic room while shouting swear words. He was shot in his right leg and left hand after reportedly throwing the axe at a police officer who arrived at the scene. Westergaard's five-year-old granddaughter was present in the living room of the house during the incident, but neither Westergaard nor his grandchild were harmed. Bomb disposal experts searched the home in order to ensure that a device had not been planted. The Somali man was carried into court on a stretcher to face two charges of attempted murder, which he denied. He was not named at the time of his arrest as the result of an injunction in the Danish courts. A spokesman for al-Shabab, Sheikh Ali Muhamud Rage, commented: "We appreciate the incident in which a Muslim Somali boy attacked the devil who abused our prophet Mohammed and we call upon all Muslims around the world to target the people like him." On 4 February 2011, the attacker, named in court as Mohamed Geele, was sentenced to nine years in prison for attempting to commit an act of terrorism. Geele appealed the sentence, claiming that he was attempting to scare Westergaard to make him "stop bragging about drawing the cartoon", but was subsequently sentenced to 10 years imprisonment and permanent expulsion from Denmark by the High Court on 22 June 2011.

=== February ===
Following a meeting between the editor-in-chief of the Danish newspaper Politiken Tøger Seidenfaden and Faisal A.Z. Yamani, Saudi attorney-at-law, who represented eight Muslim groups from the Middle East and Australia, the Danish newspaper apologized for having reprinted a cartoon by Kurt Westergaard in 2008, and issued a press release saying: "Politiken has never intended to reprint the Cartoon Drawing as a statement of editorial opinion or values but merely as part of the newspaper's news coverage (...) We apologize to anyone who was offended by our decision to reprint the cartoon drawing." The apology prompted criticism from leading Danish politicians, among them prime minister Lars Løkke Rasmussen, who stated that "Politiken is bowing to other's views of our freedom of speech and this can lead to further attacks on Danish freedom of speech," as well as the head of the Danish Union of Journalists, but Politiken has replied that the settlement did not mean that it had imposed on itself a ban on future publications of the drawings.

=== September ===
==== 8 September ====
German Chancellor Angela Merkel honours cartoonist Kurt Westergaard. He received the M100 media prize for his "courage" to defend democratic values despite threats of violence and death. The Central Council of Muslims in Germany criticized the award ceremony.

==== 10 September ====
A small explosion at Hotel Jørgensen in Copenhagen was described by the police as an accident with a letter bomb that was meant to be sent to Jyllands-Posten.

==== 28 September ====
A 37-year-old Iraqi Kurd that was arrested in Norway earlier that year suspected of planning unspecified terrorist attacks confessed that one of his targets was Jyllands-Posten.

==== 30 September ====
The journalist Flemming Rose published his 500-page book Tavshedens Tyranni (Tyranny of Silence) on the fifth anniversary of the first publishing of the cartoons.

=== October ===
==== 5 October ====
The newspaper destroyed an edition of its weekend supplement, Uke-Adressa, before it was distributed. The reason was a satirical drawing by the newspaper's cartoonist, Jan O. Henriksen, that editor Arne Blix in subsequent interviews stated was in conflict with editorial policies. Blix declined to give details of the drawing or the reason for its unacceptability, however according to Henriksen the depiction was of Kurt Westergaard holding one of his Mohammad drawings.

==== 13 October ====
Denmark's foreign minister Lene Espersen met in Cairo with the Grand Imam of Al-Azhar, Ahmed al-Tayeb, on 13 October 2010, and stated that the hurt caused to Muslims from cartoons lampooning Muhammad was "very regrettable". She denies that this should be interpreted as an apology for the drawings, stating "I explained that the people of Denmark has no wish to violate or hurt the feelings of others. We do not wish to demonize anyone, we are a tolerant people. And then I explained our constitutional right to free speech, and they understood".

=== December ===
In December 2010, a classified diplomatic cable leaked that had been written in September 2006 by James P. Cain, the United States Ambassador to Denmark at the time. It reported that the Jyllands-Posten had decided against reprinting the cartoons on the first anniversary of the original publication, and observed: "Our discreet discussions with the paper and with senior Danish government officials underscore both how close we came to another potential crisis and how much the defense of free speech and domestic political calculations remain paramount for the government and for many Danes."

==== 29 December ====
Five men were arrested in connection with a suspected plot to stage a gun attack of the offices of the Jyllands-Posten in Copenhagen. Jakob Scharf, the head of Denmark's PET intelligence agency, described the men as "militant Islamists". Four of the suspects, including Munir Awad, were detained in Denmark, and the fifth was detained in Sweden.

== 2011 ==
=== February ===
Commemorating the demonstrations in Benghazi on 17 February 2006 that were initially against the Jyllands-Posten Muhammad cartoons, but which turned into protests against Gaddafi, the National Conference for the Libyan Opposition plans a coordinated protest by all anti-Gaddafi groups. The ensuing "Day of Revolt" or "Day of Rage" against Muammar Gaddafi develops into the Libyan Civil War.

== 2012 ==
=== January ===
Oslo District Court found two men guilty of planning a terror attack against Jyllands-Posten and the cartoonist Kurt Westergaard. In October Borgarting Court of Appeal upheld the convictions and sentenced one of the convicted who is of Uighur origin to eight years in prison and the other who is of Iraqi Kurdish origin to three years in prison. The former has appealed the sentence to the Supreme Court of Norway.

== 2013 ==
=== February ===
A few days after the assumed assassination attempt of Lars Hedegaard, The Islamic Society in Denmark stated that it had been a mistake to go to Lebanon and Egypt in 2006 to show the caricatures of Muhammad.

=== March ===
Kurt Westergaard and his Danish gallery "Galleri Draupner" released a new edition of the Muhammad cartoons. The first one was made in 2000 for the Danish art museum in Frederikshavn and the second and third were made for Jyllands Posten. They were all handmade, printed, framed, numbered (only 40 were printed) and sold in an all-leather box on a special event in the gallery in Skanderborg.

== 2021 ==
=== March ===
A teacher working at Batley Grammar School in Batley, North England was suspended after showing students an image of the cartoon of Muhammad taken from the Danish newspaper. The teacher went under police protection, with authorities worried for her safety following the murder of Samuel Paty in which a French teacher was decapitated for allegedly showing students an image of Muhammad made by Charlie Hebdo.
