= List of newspapers that reprinted Jyllands-Posten's Muhammad cartoons =

Countries (in orange) where one or more of the images were published in some form

This is a list of newspapers that have reprinted the Jyllands-Posten Muhammad cartoons or printed new cartoons depicting Muhammad in response to the controversy. This list is probably not complete.

== Ordered chronologically ==
Country	Source	Circulation	Number printed	Print date	Notes
Denmark	Jyllands-Posten	157,000 daily	12 cartoons	30 September 2005	
Egypt	El Fagr	50,000 weekly	6 cartoons	17 October 2005	
Netherlands	Elsevier	142,549 weekly	12 cartoons	21 October 2005	
Netherlands	De Volkskrant	300,494 daily	3 cartoons	29 October 2005	
Bosnia and Herzegovina	Slobodna Bosna		?	3 November 2005	
United States	New York Sun		1 cartoon	4 November 2005	
Germany	Frankfurter Allgemeine Zeitung	375,000 daily	1 cartoon	7 November 2005	
Romania	Evenimentul Zilei	73,000 daily	2 cartoons	9 November 2005	
Denmark	Weekendavisen		12 cartoons + new ones	11 November 2005	
Norway	Aftenposten	249,861 morning, 148,067 evening	1 cartoon	2005	
United States	Valley Mirror, Sacramento	2,800, twice weekly	2 cartoons	12 November 2005	
Germany	Ketzerbriefe		1 cartoon	January 2006	
Sweden	Expressen	227,300	2 cartoons	7 January 2006	
Sweden	Kvällsposten	57,700	2 cartoons	7 January 2006	
Sweden	GT	57 100	2 cartoons	7 January 2006	
Norway	Dagbladet	183,092 daily	12 cartoons	9 January 2006	
Norway	Magazinet	5,307, 3 times/week	12 cartoons	10 January 2006	
Norway	Dagbladet	183,092 daily	12 cartoons	10 January 2006	
Switzerland	Die Weltwoche	91,213 weekly	3 cartoons	12 January 2006	
Germany	VERS1	80,000 monthly	1 cartoon	27 January 2006	
Italy	Corriere della Sera		2 cartoons	30 January 2006	
Mexico	La Crónica		1 cartoon	30 January 2006	
Iceland	DV		6 cartoons	31 January 2006	
Germany	Die Tageszeitung	55,000 daily	2 cartoons	31 January 2006	
Brazil	Folha de S.Paulo	350,000 daily	1 cartoon	31 January 2006	
Greece	Eleftherotypia		1 cartoon (only for news)	31 January 2006	
Saudi Arabia	Shams		1 cartoon	At the beginning of February 2006	
France	France Soir		12 cartoons + 1 new	1 February 2006	
France	Le Monde		1 new cartoon	1 February 2006	
Germany	Berliner Zeitung		12 cartoons	1 February 2006	
Germany	Die Welt	244,000 daily	12 cartoons	1 February 2006	
Germany	Die Zeit	465,000 weekly	1 cartoons	1 February 2006	
Hungary	Magyar Hírlap	38,000 daily		1 February 2006	
Finland	Helsingin Sanomat	429,244 daily	Photo of another newspaper with 1 cartoon on it	1 February 2006	
Netherlands	De Volkskrant	300,494 daily	12 cartoons	1 February 2006	
Netherlands	NRC Handelsblad	249,710 daily	12 cartoons	1 February 2006	
Netherlands	Het Parool	86,588 daily	? cartoons	? February 2006	
Netherlands	Trouw	113,234 daily	? cartoons	? February 2006	
Netherlands	De Telegraaf	709,745 daily	12 cartoons	1 February 2006	
Italy	La Stampa		12 cartoons	1 February 2006	
Portugal	Público		4 cartoons	1 February 2006	
Spain	El Periódico de Catalunya		12 cartoons	1 February 2006	
Spain	El Mundo		12 cartoons	1 February 2006	
Switzerland	Blick			1 February 2006	
Switzerland	Tribune de Geneve			1 February 2006	
Switzerland	Le Temps		?? new cartoons	1 February 2006	
Belgium	Le Soir		1 new cartoon This was a blank cartoon that was captioned "Ceci n'est pas Mahomet"	2 February 2006	
Argentina	Página/12		1 cartoon	2 February 2006	
Uruguay	Terra		12 cartoons	2 February 2006	
Bulgaria	Novinar		12 cartoons	2 February 2006	
Bulgaria	Monitor		6 cartoons	2 February 2006	
France	Libération		2 cartoons	2 February 2006	
Germany	Tagesspiegel			2 February 2006	
Hungary	Népszabadság	200,000 daily	??	2 February 2006	
Ireland	Daily Star	100,000	1 cartoon	2 February 2006	
Italy	la Repubblica		2 cartoons	2 February 2006	
Jordan	Al-Shihan		3 cartoons	2 February 2006	
Jordan	Al-Mehwar		12 cartoons	2 February 2006	
New Zealand	National Business Review	13,000 weekly	1 cartoon	2 February 2006	
Spain	El País			2 February 2006	
United States	Human Events		12 cartoons	2 February 2006	
United States	New York Sun		2 cartoons	2 February 2006	
Greenland	Sermitsiaq		3 cartoons	2 February 2006	
Yemen	Yemen Observer		Fragments of cartoons w/ Xs across them	2 February 2006	
Belgium	De Standaard	80,000 daily	12 cartoons	3 February 2006	
Belgium	Het Volk		?? new cartoons	3 February 2006	
Belgium	De Morgen		??	3 February 2006	
Belgium	Het Nieuwsblad		??	3 February 2006	
Belgium	La Libre Belgique		1 new cartoon	3 February 2006	
Austria	Der Standard		3 cartoons	3 February 2006	
Austria	Die Presse			3 February 2006	
Austria	Kleine Zeitung			3 February 2006	
Honduras	El Heraldo		12 cartoons	3 February 2006	
India	The Times of India, Patna Edition		12 cartoons	3 February 2006	
Costa Rica	Al Día		1 cartoon	3 February 2006	
Malaysia	Guang Ming		1 cartoon	3 February 2006	
South Africa	Mail and Guardian		2 cartoons	3 February 2006	
South Korea	Ohmy News		1 cartoon	3 February 2006	
United States	Riverside Press Enterprise, California		1 cartoon	3 February 2006	
Italy	Libero		12 cartoons	3 February 2006	
Italy	La Padania		12 cartoons	3 February 2006	
Slovakia	SME		12 cartoons	3 February 2006	
Canada	Le Devoir, Montreal		1 cartoon	3 February 2006	
United States	Austin American-Statesman	177,000 daily	1 cartoon	3 February 2006	
Czech Republic	Hospodářské noviny		12 cartoons	4 February 2006	
Czech Republic	Mladá fronta Dnes	300,000 daily	12 cartoons	4 February 2006	
Japan	The Japan Times		12 cartoons	4 February 2006	
Malaysia	Sarawak Tribune		1 cartoon	4 February 2006	
New Zealand	Christchurch Press	91,000 daily	2 cartoons	4 February 2006	
New Zealand	The Dominion Post	98,000 daily	12 cartoons	4 February 2006	
New Zealand	Nelson Mail		1 cartoon	4 February 2006	
Poland	Rzeczpospolita		2 cartoons	4 February 2006	
United States	The Philadelphia Inquirer	382,000 daily	1 cartoon	4 February 2006	
Australia	The Courier-Mail, Brisbane		1 cartoon	5 February 2006	
Czech Republic	Nedělní Svět		4 cartoons	5 February 2006	
Fiji	Fiji Daily Post		12 cartoons	5 February 2006	
Switzerland	NZZ am Sonntag		1 cartoon	5 February 2006	
United States	Akron Beacon Journal		1 new cartoon	5 February 2006	
Israel	Jerusalem Post		12 cartoons	6 February 2006	
Venezuela	Últimas Noticias			6 February 2006	
Croatia	Nacional		12 cartoons	6 February 2006	
Indonesia	PETA Tabloid		10 cartoons	6 February 2006	
Indonesia	Gloria Surabaya		3 cartoons	6 February 2006	
Germany	Focus	745,000 weekly	12 cartoons	6 February 2006	
Ukraine	Sevodnya			6 February 2006	
Slovenia	Mladina		2 cartoons	6 February 2006	
Slovenia	Žurnal			6 February 2006	
Slovenia	Direkt			6 February 2006	
United Kingdom	Gair Rhydd	8,000 weekly	1 cartoon	6 February 2006	
Yemen	Al-Hurriya			6 February 2006	
Yemen	al-Rai al-Aam			6 February 2006	
Algeria	Errisala		Blurred cartoons	6 February 2006	
Algeria	Irqaa		Blurred cartoons	6 February 2006	
Brazil	Revista Veja	1,200,000 weekly	3 cartoons	7 February 2006	
Lithuania	Respublika		4 (or 1 and 9)	7 February 2006 (or 2006-02-06 and 2006-02-08)	
United States	Denver Rocky Mountain News		1 cartoon	7 February 2006	
Australia	Rockhampton Morning Bulletin		1 cartoon	8 February 2006	
France	Charlie Hebdo		12 cartoons + 1 new	8 February 2006	
Canada	UPEI Cadre	2,000, all recalled	12 cartoons	8 February 2006	
Paraguay	La Papa		12 cartoons + 3 others	8 February 2006	
Lithuania	Vakaro Žinios		12 cartoons + new	8 February 2006	
United States	Harvard Salient	Fortnightly	4 cartoons	8 February 2006	
United States	Victorville Daily Press, California		1 cartoon	8 February 2006	
United States	County Press, Newtown Square, Pennsylvania (and sister pubs)	Weekly	1 cartoon + 1 classical Persian image of Mohammed	8 February 2006	
United States	The Stranger, Seattle		4 cartoons	9 February 2006	
United States	Daily Illini, University of Illinois		6 cartoons	9 February 2006	
Canada	Jewish Free Press, Calgary		3 cartoons	9 February 2006	
Germany	Der Spiegel	1,100,000 weekly	12 cartoon	9 February 2006	
United States	The Daily Tar Heel, UNC, Chapel Hill, North Carolina		1 new cartoon	9 February 2006	
Russia	Volgograd Gorodskiye vesti		1 new cartoon	9 February 2006	
Macedonia	Vreme		12 cartoons	10 February 2006	
Macedonia	Vest		12 cartoons	10 February 2006	
Russia	Bryansk Subbota		2 cartoons	10 February 2006	
Angola	Agora			11 February 2006	
Morocco	Le Journal Hebdomadaire	Weekly	photo of 12 cartoons blotted out	11 February 2006	
Canada	Western Standard, Calgary	40,000 weekly	8 cartoons	13 February 2006	
United States	The Northern Star, NIU, DeKalb, Illinois		12 cartoons	13 February 2006	
United States	The Badger Herald, UW, Madison	16,000 daily	1 cartoon	13 February 2006	
United States	The Vanguard, University of South Alabama		1 cartoon	13 February 2006	
Chile	24 Horas		1 cartoon	14 February 2006	
Peru	RPP Noticias		1 cartoon	14 February 2006	
Russia	Nash Region, Vologda		12 cartoons	15 February 2006	
United States	The Communicator		12 cartoons	15 February 2006	
United States	Spare Change, Cambridge, Massachusetts		2 cartoons	15 February 2006	
United States	The Billings Outpost, Montana		1 new cartoon	16 February 2006	
United States	Rhinoceros Times, Greensboro, North Carolina	Weekly	2 cartoons	16 February 2006	
Mozambique	Savana	Weekly	8 cartoons	17 February 2006	
Belarus	Zgoda		12 cartoons	21 February 2006	
India	Senior India	Weekly	12 cartoons	23 February 2006	
Finland	Kaltio	8,000	1 new cartoon	23 February 2006	
United States	Tiger Town Observer, Clemson University		12 cartoons	24 February 2006	
United States	Clemson Forum, Clemson University		12 cartoons	24 February 2006	
United States	Oregon Commentator, University of Oregon, Eugene, Oregon	2000 monthly	12 cartoons + 7 others	2 March 2006	
United States	The Columns, Fairmont State University, West Virginia		12 cartoons	6 March 2006	
United States	Free Inquiry		4 cartoons	7 March 2006, for April/May Edition	
United Kingdom	Y Llan		1 new cartoon, reprinted from Le Soir (France)	21 March 2006	
Estonia	KesKus		12 cartoons	10 April 2006	
United States	The Courier, College of DuPage, Illinois	Student Paper	12 cartoons	5 May 2006	
United States	Harper's Magazine	National magazine	12 cartoons	June 2006	
France	Le Parisien		??	??	
Chile	La Tercera		12 cartoons	??	
Chile	El Mercurio		??	??	
Switzerland	24 Heures		3 cartoons	2006	
Denmark	Politiken		1 cartoon	2008	

== Newspapers closed, editors fired or arrested ==
Several editors were fired or/and arrested for their decision, or their intention, to re-publish the cartoons. Several newspapers were closed and at least one apologized.

=== Algeria ===
On February 12, 2006, Algeria closed two newspapers and arrested their editors for printing the images of Muhammad. Kahel Bousaad and Berkane Bouderbala, the respective editors of pro-Islamist weeklies Errisala and Iqraa, were detained and would appear before an investigating judge in Algiers, staff of the two Arabic newspapers said.

=== Belarus ===
Alexander Sdvizhkov, editor of the Zgoda opposition newspaper was sentenced to three years in prison for incitement of religious and national hatred on January 18, 2008. The newspaper was shut down in March 2006 for publishing the cartoons, and remains shut to date.

=== Canada ===
The University of Prince Edward Island's student newspaper The Cadre was removed from circulation by university authorities after reprinting some of the cartoons. The issue was subsequently pulled and destroyed by the UPEI Student Union, who publishes the student paper.

The now defunct Western Standard was the only notable English-language Canadian publication to print the cartoons. Publisher Ezra Levant was investigated by the Albertan Human Rights Commission for 900 days before being acquitted. Levant was the only person in the Western world charged for reprinting the cartoons, and under the HRC's operating rules was also responsible for his own legal fees which amounted to over $100,000.

=== Denmark ===
Politiken, a Danish newspaper which reprinted a single cartoon by Kurt Westergaard, has apologized for "offending Muslims", saying, "We apologize to anyone who was offended by our decision to reprint the cartoon drawing." The apology came as the result of a settlement reached between the newspaper and a group of eight Muslim groups from the Middle East and Australia.

=== Finland ===
Helsingin Sanomat reports: "The immediate feeling one gets is that this has all the makings of a good drama: an Oulu cultural magazine called Kaltio publishes a topical strip-cartoon, the magazine's editor get fired for it, and the illustrator loses a commission from the city."

=== France ===
Jacques Lefranc, managing director of France Soir, was fired after reprinting and prominently publishing an in-house cartoon about the controversy.

=== Jordan ===
Three of the cartoons were reprinted in the Jordanian weekly newspaper al-Shihan. The editor, Jihad Momani, was fired, and the publisher withdrew the newspaper from circulation. Jihad Momani issued a public apology, and was arrested and charged with insulting religion. Several of the cartoons were reprinted in the Jordanian newspaper al-Mehwar. Both men were sentenced to two months in prison on 30 May 2006.

=== Malaysia ===
Lester Melanyi, an editor of the Sarawak Tribune resigned from his post for allowing the reprinting of a cartoon. In East Malaysia non-Muslims are a majority in the otherwise predominantly Muslim state. The chief editor was summoned to the Internal Security Ministry. The Malaysian government has also shut down the newspaper indefinitely. Malaysia's third-largest Chinese-language daily, Guang Ming, was suspended from publication of its evening edition for carrying one of the cartoons in its February 3 edition. The suspension ran for two weeks from February 16 to March 1, 2006. The TV3 television station which aired some of the cartoons, however, has not been suspended.

=== Russia ===
The Russian weekly newspaper Nash Region was closed by its owner, Mikhail Smirnov: "I shut it down so that it wouldn't become a real cause of religious strife". Nash Region published a collage of the cartoons on 15 February 2006 as part of an article examining the cartoon controversy. It was the first time the cartoons had appeared in a Russian paper and prosecutors immediately opened an investigation into the editor, Anna Smirnova, on charges that she had used her position to incite hatred. The mayor of the southern Russian city of Volgograd ordered the closure of the city-owned newspaper Gorodskiye Vesti after it published a cartoon depicting Muhammad on February 21, 2006.

=== Saudi Arabia ===
The Shams (Sun) was suspended as part of an investigation into its decision to publish the cartoons that have caused anger across the Muslim world.

=== South Africa ===
Courts in South Africa preemptively forbade any publication of cartoons containing Mohammed.

=== United Kingdom ===
The Cardiff University student newspaper gair rhydd (which is Welsh for free word) became the first organisation in the United Kingdom to publish the images. The day after publication, the decision was taken to pulp the edition and only approximately 200 copies were actually distributed. The editor along with two journalists were suspended for the decision to publish. Gair rhydd resumed publication on 13 February 2006, with an apology. Meurig Llwyd Williams, Archdeacon of Bangor, included a drawing, reprinted from the French newspaper Le Soir, in the church paper Y Llan. It showed Muhammad sitting on a heavenly cloud with God and Buddha and being told: "Don't complain - we've all been caricatured here." He was forced to resign and the issue of the paper was destroyed.

=== United States ===
Staff of the New York Press walked out in protest after management disallowed them to reproduce the cartoons as part of their reporting. Two editors of the University of Illinois' student paper, the Daily Illini, were suspended (one later fired) after reprinting the cartoons. Days after the Illini printing, Northern Illinois University's campus newspaper The Northern Star also printed the cartoons, this time with the permission of their faculty adviser, and the consensus of the editors. The paper received letters on both sides of the issue for months. The Harvard Salient, a conservative student biweekly at Harvard College, also printed the cartoons and were subject to a town hall forum by the Harvard College Interfaith Council.

=== Yemen ===
Yemen detained three journalists on February 12, 2006 (detaining a fourth shortly afterwards), and closed three publications that reprinted the cartoons: Al-Hurriya, Yemen Observer and al-Rai al-Aam. Those detained were Mohammed Al-Asadi, editor-in-chief of the English-language daily Yemen Observer, Akram Sabra, managing editor of the weekly al-Hurriya, reporter Yehiya al-Abed of Hurriya, and Kamal al-Aalafi, editor-in-chief of Arabic weekly al-Rai al-Aam. The Yemeni journalists' association called for the release of the journalists and for the annulment of the closure decrees "because these measures were not ordered by a court". On 3 May the newspapers reopened, although some charges persist.

On 24 November 2006, Kamal al-Aalafi was sentenced to a year in prison. The sentencing court also ordered that the paper be closed for six months and that al-Aalafi himself not be permitted to write for an equal amount of time. He was subsequently released on bail.

On 4 December 2006, Mohammed al-Asaadi was ordered jailed until he could pay a fine of 500,000 rials (approximately $2500).
