= Xpress Radio =

Coordinates: 51.48834°N 3.17756°W

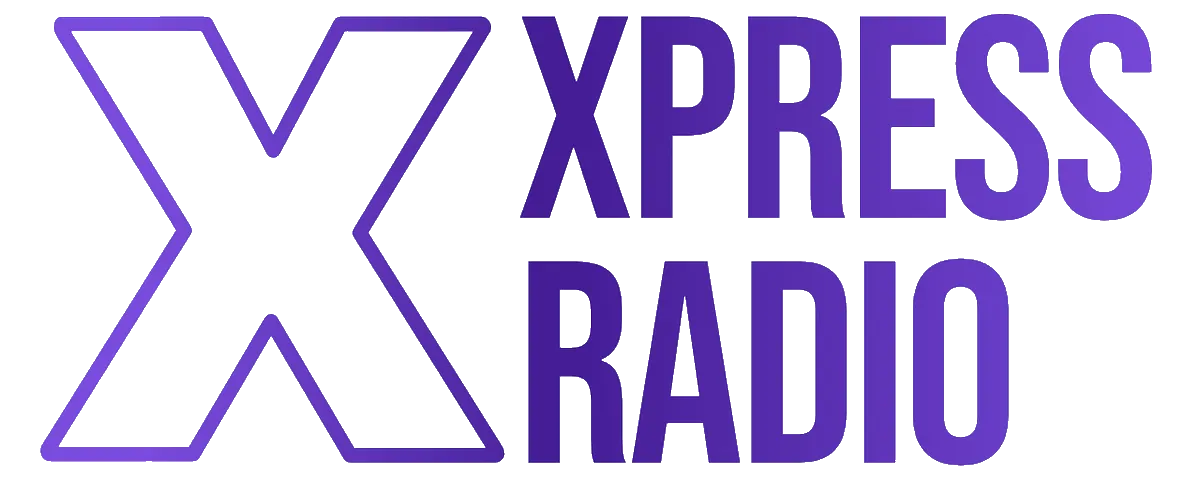
- Cardiff's Student Sound
- Cardiff; Wales
- Broadcast area: Cardiff University & Cardiff
- Frequency: Online

Programming
- Format: University Radio

Ownership
- Owner: Cardiff University Students' Union
- Operator: Olly Shawcross

History
- First air date: 1996
- Former names: Xpress FM 106.2
- Former frequencies: 106.2 FM 87.7FM

Links
- Webcast: X Player
- Website: www.xpressradio.uk

Xpress Radio (formerly known as Xpress FM) is the student radio station for Cardiff University in Cardiff, Wales. They have a 24/7 broadcast online and in the Cardiff University Students' Union from their Park Place studio. The station is a member of the UK Student Radio Association.

== History ==
Xpress Radio was initially launched by engineering students of Cardiff University under a four-week restricted service licence (RSL) to report on a meningitis outbreak in Cardiff in October of that year, funded through the Students' Union and the university itself.

By the mid-2000s, they had an all-day broadcast in the Students' Union and were broadcasting on the 87.7FM frequency on fortnightly stints every year.

== Achievements ==
Xpress Radio won the Student Radio Station of the Year award in 2005.

They have also won numerous awards in the New York Radio Festivals, including for their Welsh Varsity 2014 coverage, and subsequently won Gold in Best Live Event or Outside Broadcast during the 2015 Student Radio Awards for their Welsh Varsity 2015 coverage.

== Current position ==
On 6 December 2025, Xpress Radio hosted the "Xpressathon", a one-off 24-hour show in aid of Millie Mittoo Children’s Projects (MMCP). The Fundraiser ended up rasing £824 for the charity by the end of the event.

In the 2025/26 academic year, they have secured interviews with artists such as Nathan Sykes during his promotional tour for his album 'Ultraviolet', Sykes' second studio album. They also secured an interview with Akon during his 2026 UK Tour to promote his new 'Beautiful Day' album.

== Alumni ==
Sam MacGregor & Danni Diston of BBC Radio 1 first started as hosts on the #FridayBrunch by Xpress Radio during the 2018/19 academic year, winning Best Entertainment Show at the Cardiff Student Media Awards.
