= Cardiff University Students' Union =

Students' union in Wales

Coordinates: 51.48834°N 3.17756°W

Cardiff Students' Union
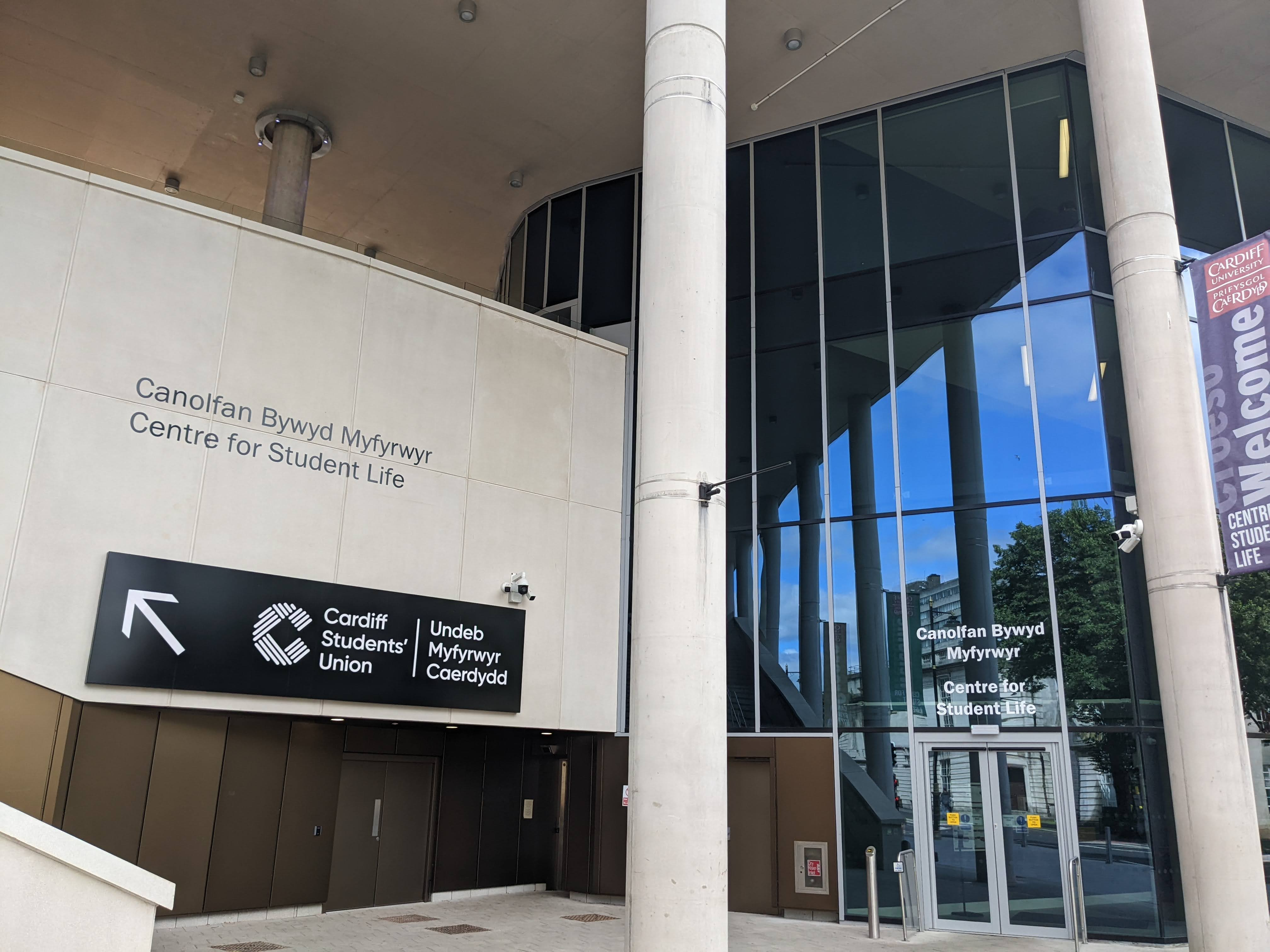
- Motto: The Heart of Cardiff Student Life
- Institution: Cardiff University
- Location: Park Place, Cardiff
- President: Joshua Tandy
- Chief Executive: Daniel Palmer
- Affiliations: National Union of Students Wales; British Universities and Colleges Sport
- Website: www.cardiffstudents.com

Cardiff Students' Union (CSU, Welsh:Undeb Myfyrwyr Caerdydd) is the Students' Union for Cardiff University and is located in Cardiff, Wales.

Cardiff Students' Union supports over 200 student societies and 60 sports clubs with more than 10,000 members.

The Students' Union is also the recognised voice of students at Cardiff University, joining students in campaigning about the issues important to them. The trading subsidiary of CUSU, Cardiff Union Services Limited, manages a purpose-built facility in the centre of Cardiff and operates cafes, shops, bars and events that help fund CUSU's charitable activities. CUSU is based on Park Place and at the Heath Park campus, employing over 100 permanent staff and 300 student staff.

== Leadership of the Students' Union ==
=== Students' Union elections ===
Cardiff Students' Union Student Senate

Leadership
- Chair: Micaela Panes

Structure
- Sabbatical Officers* (2); Campaign Officers (10); Student Senators (25); Academic Representatives* (10); Students* (9) *These seats are randomly allocated meeting by meeting.

The Students' Union is a democratic membership organisation. The Students' Union is led by groups such as Elected Officers, Campaign Officers, Student Senate, Scrutiny Committee and NUS delegates.

Elections for these positions are held twice each year:

- By-Elections are held in October for Student Senate, Scrutiny Committee and NUS Delegates as well as any positions that were not filled in the February Main Elections
- Main Elections are held in February for Elected Officer and Campaign Officer Positions.

Full-time elected officers – A group of 7 full-time paid individuals who each have areas of responsibility, from being the Students' Union President to Societies and Sports, the Heath Park campus, Welsh language, and Postgraduate and International students. These officers are elected for a year, and either take a year out of university to do the job or do it after they graduate.

Part-time campaign officers – These are 10 student volunteers who campaign on areas that matter to you alongside their studies. These roles as of 2026 include; Accessibility Officer, Anti-Racism Officer, Estranged Students' Officer, Ethical and Environmental Officer, Heath Park Students’ Officer, LGBTQ+ Officer, Mental Health Officer and Women's Officer.

=== Specific leadership positions ===
==== Full-time elected officer positions ====
The Elected Officer positions consist of a President and six vice-presidents.

- Students' Union President – The President leads the Elected Officer team and the Students' Union as a whole and acts as the key link to the university's Vice-Chancellor, Pro Vice-Chancellors, Council and Senate, as well as the NUS and other key stakeholders.
- Vice President Heath Park Campus – The VP Heath Park Campus works to improve the Heath campus student experience and the services at the site, representing its students on a range of matters including academic issues and getting involved in clubs and societies. This role will become Vice President Undergraduate Students in the 26/27 officer team after the decision was approved to change it at the Annual General Meeting in November 2025.
- Vice President International Students – The VP International Students represents international students on the issues and policies that affect them. This role was introduced in 2024-25.
- Vice President Postgraduate Students – The VP Postgraduate Students represents all postgrad students on the issues and policies that affect them. This role was introduced in 2015–16.
- Vice President Sports and Athletic Union President – The Vice President Sport and Athletic Union President champions sport within the university and local community. This position represents students who play both competitive and participation sports to both the university and the Union.
- Vice President Societies & Volunteering – This position champions societies and student-led activity within the Union, university and community and is responsible for allocating budgets and tiers as well as supporting and promoting Student Led Services/Campaign Associations.
- Vice President Welsh Language, Community and Culture - The VP Welsh Language was introduced in 2023-24 to replace the previous part-time role, representing Welsh speakers and developing Welsh medium education.

Part-time elected officers include the Ethical and Environmental Officer, LGBT+ Officer (Open), LGBT+ Officer (Trans), International Students Officer, Mature Students Officer, Students with Disabilities Officer, Women's Officer, Estranged Students' Officer and Black and Minority Ethnic Students Officer, Student Parents & Carers Officer and Mental Health Officer.

=== Notable former presidents ===
- Neil Kinnock – Welsh politician (born 1942) (1965–66)
- Emyr Jones Parry – British diplomat (born 1947) (1968–69)
- Jeff Cuthbert – Welsh politician (1974–75)
- Bill Rammell – British Labour politician (1982–83)
- Victoria Starmer – Spouse of the British Prime Minister from 2024 to 2026 (1994–95)

== Locations and facilities ==
The main Students' Union building is opposite the university's Main Building, and is built over a railway line with entrances on Park Place and Senghenydd Road. It was built in 1973 and was designed by the Welsh architect Alex Gordon.

The Students’ Union at the Heath is situated in the IV Lounge in the Neuadd Meirionnydd building. It acts as a point of contact for students on the campus, supporting students in accessing services. The second floor of the Students’ Union currently houses the main reception, event function space and the recently developed Centre for Skills, Enterprise and Volunteering, as well as newly developed Food outlets, the Taf and the nightclub, Y Plas.

The union's pub is called "The Taf". This is commonly mistaken to be a reference to the River Taff which runs through Cardiff, but it is actually a contraction of "Tafarn", the Welsh word for "pub". The Union has an in-house nightclub, Y Plas, which holds events throughout the week. Formerly named Solus, the Nightclub was renamed as a result of a student vote after a redevelopment of the second floor and nightclub was announced. The Union can link both the Taf bar and Y Plas with the Great hall to make a "superclub" of 4000, making it the biggest nightclub in Cardiff, and also one of the largest in Wales. The club was renamed Y Plas in 2014, after the refurbishments.

The third floor of the Students' Union is where students can meet the elected officer team, join a sports club or society, get involved in Student Voice and democratic processes. A counselling service, known as Student Advice which helps with all manner of issues that students can face.

The Union's Great Hall has attracted popular bands and musicians since the 1970s. The Great Hall also serves as one of Cardiff University's exam venues, and has recently been adapted for use as a lecture theatre by the university during term time. It also hosts the freshers fayres for the beginning of term to join in volunteering, sports clubs and societies.

The main building also houses the offices of student media including the studios of Xpress Radio (which is broadcast throughout the union), the student newspaper Gair Rhydd (Welsh for 'Free Word'), Quench Magazine, and the newly developed Cardiff Union TV (CUTV).

== Services ==
=== Activities ===
The Athletic Union is the body that supports all sporting activity at Cardiff Students' Union. It supports students that run over 60 sports clubs including individual and team sports, outdoor and water sports and martial arts. This is built on the ethos that sport plays a significant role in the student experience, playing a role in helping to build social and support groups, keeping students active, and most importantly, offering a valuable opportunity for individuals to develop themselves.

The Guild of Societies contains over 200 student groups. The Guild of Societies is the umbrella organisation of every student led society at Cardiff Students' Union, led overall by the VP Societies and the Societies Executive Committee. You must be a member of the Guild to join any societies.
