= Swedish Freedom of the Press Act =

Part of the Swedish Constitution

Tryckfrihetsförordningen
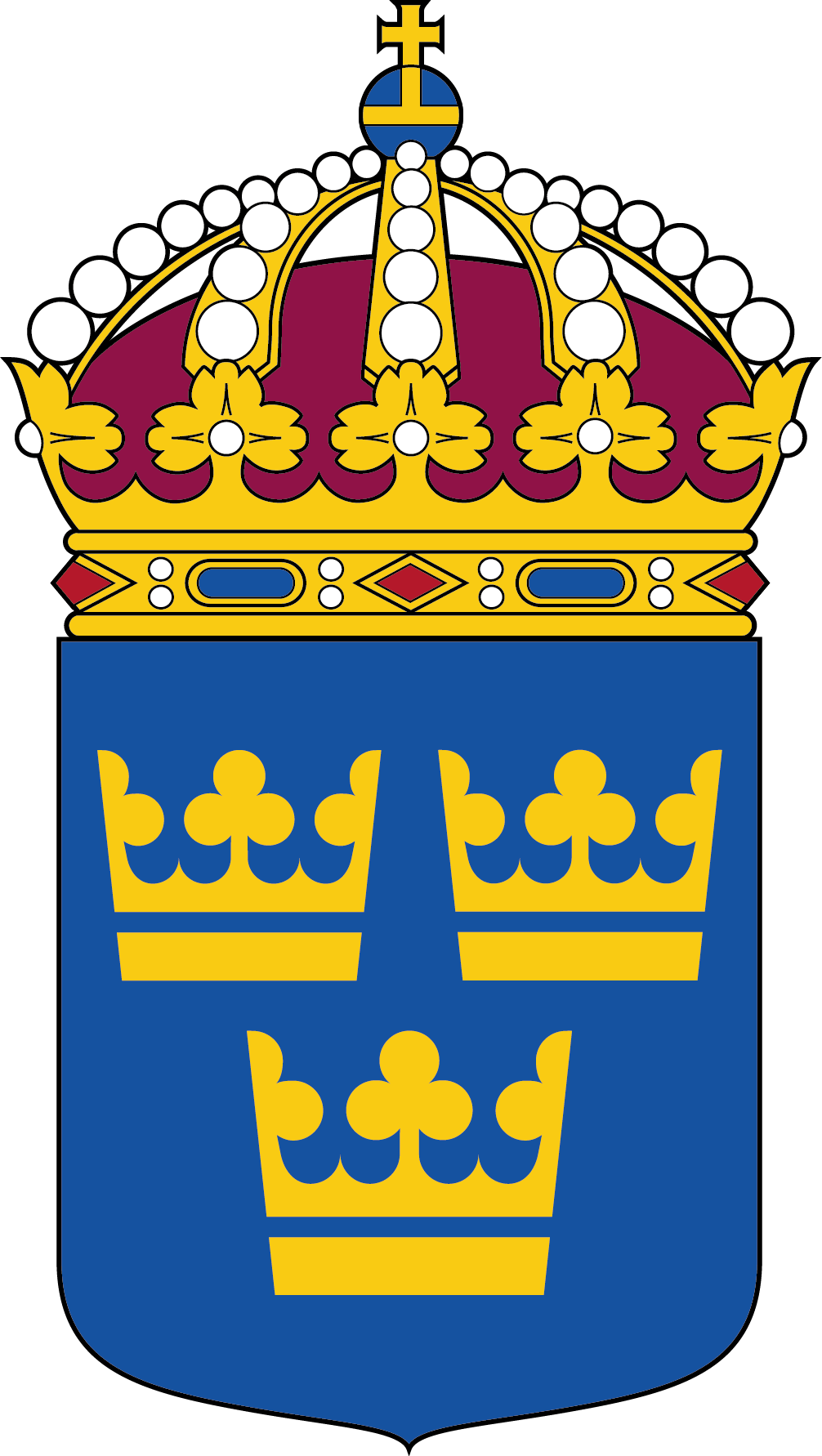
- Swedish Code of Statutes
- Citation: Tryckfrihetsförordning (1949:105)
- Territorial extent: Sweden
- Enacted: 1766 (first version); 1949 (current)
- Commenced: 1 January 1950

Keywords
- Constitution of Sweden; Monarchy of Sweden

The Freedom of the Press Act (Swedish: Tryckfrihetsförordningen) is one of four Fundamental Laws of the Realm (Swedish: rikets grundlagar) and thus forms part of the Swedish Constitution. The Act regulates matters regarding freedom of press and principle of public access to official records. The Freedom of the Press Act as well as the Fundamental Law on Freedom of Expression (Swedish: Yttrandefrihetsgrundlagen) is one of the two "basic media acts" in Sweden. The Freedom of the Press Act is derived from the Freedom of the Press Act of 1766; the legislation is regarded as the world's first law supporting the freedom of the press and freedom of information.

== History ==
=== Freedom of the Press Act of 1766 and the Age of Liberty ===
Following the death of King Charles XII in 1718, Swedish monarchs were robbed of much of their power through the new Instruments of Government, or constitutions, of 1719 and 1720. During the Age of Liberty of the Swedish 18th century, decline of monarchical power led to an increase in the importance of the Council of the Realm and the Riksdag. Though the Riksdag retained its four chambers—for nobility, clergy, burghers, and peasantry—it developed two strong parties known as the "Hats" and the "Caps." The political differences between the two parties highlighted the need for freedom of the press and freedom of expression, and proposals to abolish prior censorship were put forward in the Riksdag in both 1727 and 1738. However, due to the Hats' long-standing hold on power all attempts at legislation in this area were effectively stifled for many years.

In 1765, the Caps came into power and initiated a comprehensive programme to rationalise the state bureaucracy and the application of the fundamental laws. The Ostrobothnian priest Anders Chydenius was a driving force and author behind one of the three pleas for freedom of the press submitted to the Riksdag. In his writing, he concluded:

No evidence should be needed that a certain freedom of writing and printing is one of the strongest bulwarks of a free organization of the state, as, without it, the estates would not have sufficient information for the drafting of good laws, and those dispensing justice would not be monitored, nor would the subjects know the requirements of the law, the limits of the rights of government, and their responsibilities. Education and ethical conduct would be crushed; coarseness in thought, speech, and manners would prevail, and dimness would darken the entire sky of our freedom in a few years.

Anders Chydenius was a driving force in the committee preparing the freedom of the press, but he was expelled from the Riksdag in July 1766 and did not participate when the law was finalized during the autumn. In October the peasantry and the burghers voted for the law, while the nobility voted against it. The adoption of the law therefore depended on the clergy, who voted in favour under the condition that prior censorship was maintained for religious writings. With this reservation, the ordinance was adopted and gained legal force when it was signed by King Adolf Frederick on 2 December 1766. The ordinance also introduced public access to official records, including the minutes of the Riksdag and the government.

As intendeed, the immediate effect of the Freedom of the Press Act was a revitalisation of political discourse. The public gained access to public documents even in government matters, which in most cases appear to have been disclosed and published in accordance with the law. There was a sharp increase in print output and also a slight boost in the printing industry and book market.

The impact of the Freedom of the Press Act on political discourse was significant. Its most visible effect was an intensified discussion for the strengthening of civil rights and the abolishment of the noble privileges. The heated tone of the debate also led to feelings of discomfort among conservatives and large portions of the population. This, in turn, paved the way for a change of the constitution, which would put to a stop to the parliamentary system.

=== King Gustav III revisions ===
At the start of his reign King Gustav III was more or less a roi fainéant (a powerless king), which encouraged him to consider a coup d'état. In 1772, he restored royal power through a military coup and as a consequence the freedom of the press was only exercised with caution by authors and printers. Two years later, the Act was largely rolled back when Gustav III presented a redacted Freedom of the Press Act, leaving it to the king's discretion to determine what gets printed. Penalties were made more severe and violations could, in some cases, lead to execution. Although freedom of the press remained nominally intact and pre-publication censorship was not reinstated, the king exercised firm control over what was printed in the country. The new act also exempted central branches of the state apparatus from the principle of access to public records.

=== Restored freedom of the press ===
After the assassination of King Gustav III in 1792 a renewed Freedom of the Press Act was issued but nullified within a few months. It was not until the dethronement of King Gustav IV Adolf in 1809 that freedom of the press was finally restored through § 86 of the new Instrument of Government issued the same year:

Freedom of the press refers to every Swedish man’s right to publish writings without any obstacles imposed by public authorities in advance; to, subsequently, only be prosecuted for the content of ones writings before a court of law, and to not be punished unless the content violates defined laws issued to maintain public order, without hindering general enlightenment.

This provision was elaborated in a detailed Freedom of the Press Act in 1810, which was revised in 1812. With successive amendments, this act remained in force until 1949. The law contained a right to ban a publication if it endangered public order. Especially around 1830–1840, this was used many times against newspapers who criticised the government. This was circumvented by a restart of the newspaper with a slight name change. This law was removed in 1844.

=== Freedom of the Press Act of 1949 ===
After the partially illegal restrictions on freedom of the press imposed during World War II, a constitutional commission was appointed in 1944 to draft a new and strengthened Freedom of the Press Act. This new act was adopted by the Riksdag in 1949 and is still in effect. Several features from the 1766 act persist in it, such as the single responsibility of either author or publisher, the exclusivity principle (Nulla poena sine lege), and the principle of public access to public records.
