= El Fagr (Egyptian weekly newspaper) =

Egyptian weekly newspaper

El Fagr الفجر
- Type: Weekly newspaper
- Format: Broadsheet
- Owner(s): Al-Fagr for Printing and Publishing Inc.
- Editor: Manal Lashin
- Founded: 3 June 2005; 20 years ago
- Language: Arabic
- Headquarters: Cairo, Egypt
- Website: www.elfagr.org

El Fagr (IPA: [elˈfæɡɾ]; also Al Fagr, Arabic: الفجر "The dawn") is an Egyptian independent weekly newspaper, based in Cairo.

== History and profile ==
El Fagr was first published on 3 June 2005. The paper is part of Al-Fagr for Printing and Publishing Inc. The weekly, published on Thursdays, is a sensationalist publication.

Hassan Amr is one of the former editors of the paper. As of 2013 Manal Lashin was the editor-in-chief of the weekly.

In its 21st edition, dated 17 October 2005, El Fagr was the first newspaper worldwide to republish on its front page (one cartoon) and page 17, a total of six cartoons portraying the Islamic prophet Muhammad of twelve cartoons originally published in the Danish newspaper Jyllands-Posten. These twelve cartoons gave rise to the Jyllands-Posten Muhammad cartoons controversy. However, these caricatures received little attention in Egypt and the paper was not banned due to its reprints of the caricatures.

In March 2006 Amira Malsh, a journalist working for El Fagr, was sentenced to a year in prison with hard labor because of libeling a judge in an article published in the paper.

In 2013 the weekly started an award in the memory of Al Husseiny Abu Deif, a journalist who died in December 2012 during clashes among the demonstrators.

On 3 October 2019, Facebook reported that it had removed El Fagr's accounts and pages on the Facebook and Instagram platforms due to the news organization conducting "Coordinated Inauthentic Behavior." Facebook alleged that El Fagr had created fake accounts and pages posing as independent news organizations to mislead audiences across the Middle East and North Africa and criticize Iran, Turkey, and Qatar.

On 2 April 2020, Twitter reported that it had removed 2,541 accounts associated with a covert information operation attributed to El Fagr and that El Fagr was receiving direction from the Egyptian government.
