= Yemen Observer =

The Yemen Observer (Arabic: يمن أوبزرفر) is an English-language tri-weekly newspaper published in the Republic of Yemen. It was founded in 1996 by Faris Sanabani, aide and press secretary of then Yemeni President Ali Abdullah Saleh. Its editors include Editor-in-Chief Abdulaziz Oudha, Yemen Observer's feature writers are Abdulaziz Oudha, Faisal Darem Deputy Editor-in-Chief for Economic Affairs. Since 1996, the Yemen Observer Publishing House has diversified dramatically from a single bi-weekly newspaper to a five-armed media institution, publishing both in English and in Arabic: Yemen Today. Yemen Today, Arabia Felix, Sports, and Spectrum are examples for the company's fast and successful expansion.

Today, it has become the first English-speaking publishing house of the country, actively supporting Yemen in its socio-economic transition.

It also launched magazine Yemen Today is the most dynamic branch of the Publishing House, promoting investment and tourism in Yemen, a country which has promising potential in this field.

== 2006 cartoon thumbnails and blasphemy trial ==
On 4 February 2006, the Yemen Observer published two articles on Muslim reactions to the Danish cartoons depicting the Islamic Prophet Muhammad. The articles were accompanied by photographs showing 20–30,000 Yemeni women demonstrating against the cartoons, and empty shelves in a Sanaa supermarket with a sign informing customers that Danish products had been withdrawn. Also included were crossed-out thumbnail images of three of the Danish cartoons.

On 11 February 2006, former chief editor Mohammed Al-Asadi was arrested on charges of offending Islam. He was released on bail on 22 February 2006. In a trial that began on 23 February 2006, prosecution lawyers called for al-Asadi to be sentenced to death, for the paper to be closed and for all of its assets to be confiscated. Al-Asadi denied all charges and his defence team argued that the thumbnail images were accompanied by articles that condemned the cartoons and reported reactions from across the Islamic world. The prosecution claimed that the charges rested on the pictures alone, and that the accompanying articles should not be taken into account. After his release, Al-Asadi founded the Yemen Mirror.

During the trial and for nearly six months afterward, the Yemen Observer had its license to publish suspended by Yemen's Ministry of Information, but its staff continued to produce material and publish it on the paper's website.

== Yemen's Revolution ==
The outbreak of the Yemeni revolution in Yemen on 3 February 2011 affected the Yemen Observer, too. Particularly critical articles on the policy of Ali Abdullah Saleh and the often violent and brutal crackdowns on unarmed demonstrators brought trouble to the journalists.

== See also ==
- List of newspapers in Yemen
