= Shams (newspaper) =

Saudi Arabian daily newspaper (2005–2012)

- Type: Daily newspaper
- Format: Tabloid
- Owner: Turki bin Khalid bin Faisal
- Publisher: Shams Information Company for Publishing and Development
- Founded: December 2005
- Ceased publication: February 2012
- Language: Arabic
- Headquarters: Riyadh
- Country: Saudi Arabia
- Circulation: 70,000 (as of 2012)

Shams (Arabic: شمس, lit. 'Sun') was a Saudi Arabian daily newspaper published between 2005 and 2012. Its publisher described the paper as modern and trendy.

== History ==
Shams was founded as a tabloid paper in December 2005 by the Al Wataniya group. Turki bin Khalid bin Faisal, a grandson of Sultan bin Abdulaziz Al Saud, served as the chairman of the board of directors of Shams Information Company for Publishing and Development. It was also reported that he partly owned the paper.

=== Circulation ===
There is inconsistent information about the daily print of Shams. The media group publishing the paper gave the number of daily print as 120,000. In 2006, the Committee to Protect Journalists (CPJ) described Shams as a modest paper with the daily circulation of 40,000 copies. The Group Plus stated the daily circulation as more than 70,000 copies. Shams was staffed mainly by Saudi journalists. and was being printed in Riyadh, Dammam and Jeddah.

=== Target audience ===
The daily was the first paper in Saudi Arabia targeting a youth audience. Specifically, its content was targeted twoard male and female Saudi readers between the ages of 18 and 35 who were interested in modern life-style, but also loyal to Saudi Arabia's conventional customs.

=== Content ===
Shams mostly covered general local Saudi news and other top international news headlines. The content of the paper was varied and ranged from political news and social issues to business news, and various international and local sports news. It also featured the latest Internet and technology updates, fashion, university topics, cars, and various other entertainment topics. It also attempted to cover the opinions and interests of today's younger generation.

== Controversy ==
See also: Jyllands-Posten Muhammad cartoons controversy

In February 2006, publication of Shams was temporarily suspended by Saudi authorities following the reprint of several controversial cartoons depicting Muhammad that were originally published by the Danish newspaper, Jyllands-Posten in September 2005. The cartoons were printed next to articles that called for Saudis to take action against Denmark and Danish interests. The paper stated that the cartoon was published to draw attention to the controversy and to encourage a campaign against Danish interests in Saudi Arabia.

According to the Committee to Protect Journalists, Saudi Minister of Culture and Information Iyad Madani said the suspension was imposed for violating religious sensitivities. An editor of Shams noted that the cartoons had previously been approved by the ministry's censors before the issue was published, and that the suspension was tied to protests from conservative religious figures.

The next month, Shams resumed publication following the dismissal of editor Battal Koss. Koss was succeeded as editor by Khalaf Harby.

== Closure ==
At the beginning of February 2012, Shams was closed down due to the conditions beyond its management.
