= Principle of public access to official records =

Legal principle applied in Scandinavia

The principle of public access to official records in Scandinavia is the principle that everyone should have the right to take part in non-classified public records and the right to attend court proceedings. The principle of public access to official documents also means that government officials and other central and local government employees are free to divulge information.

Similar laws exist in over 70 countries, whereas 19 countries' legislation applies to information held by the government as well as private bodies, whereas the others apply to government information only.

== Sweden ==
The principle of public access to official records has existed in Sweden since 1766 and has been enshrined in one of Sweden's fundamental laws: the Freedom of the Press Act (Swedish: Tryckfrihetsförordningen). Chapter 2, section 1 of Swedish law states:

In order to promote a free exchange of opinion, free and comprehensive information, and free artistic creation, everyone should have the right to take part in public documents

The principle of public access to official records is designed to ensure that the public has a good understanding of, and can exercise civilian control over, the actions of the authorities. However, it does not give publicity to all governmental documents. For example, the deliberations of boards and working committees are usually not public.

== Finland ==
The principle of public access to official records is established in Finland's constitution in Freedom of Expression and Right of Access to Information (Finnish: Sananvapaus ja julkisuus) chapter 2, section 12:

Documents and other records in the possession of the Authority shall be publicly accessible unless, for imperative reasons, their disclosure is specifically restricted by law. Everyone has the right of access to a public document and record.

== European Union ==
Since 2001, a type of public principle has also been the basis of public access to documents within the European Union. According to both the Treaty on the Functioning of the European Union and the Public Regulation, records must be provided on request, normally within 15 working days and in any of the official languages of the Union. However, there are several far-reaching exceptions that allow for the restriction of this principle of publicity. For example, with regard to public safety, the private life of the individual and the business interests of companies. In addition, the institutions may refuse to disclose internal documents that form the basis for decision-making processes that are ongoing if the disclosure is assumed to be able to influence the decision-making process.
