= Vebjørn Selbekk =

Norwegian newspaper editor and author (born 1969)

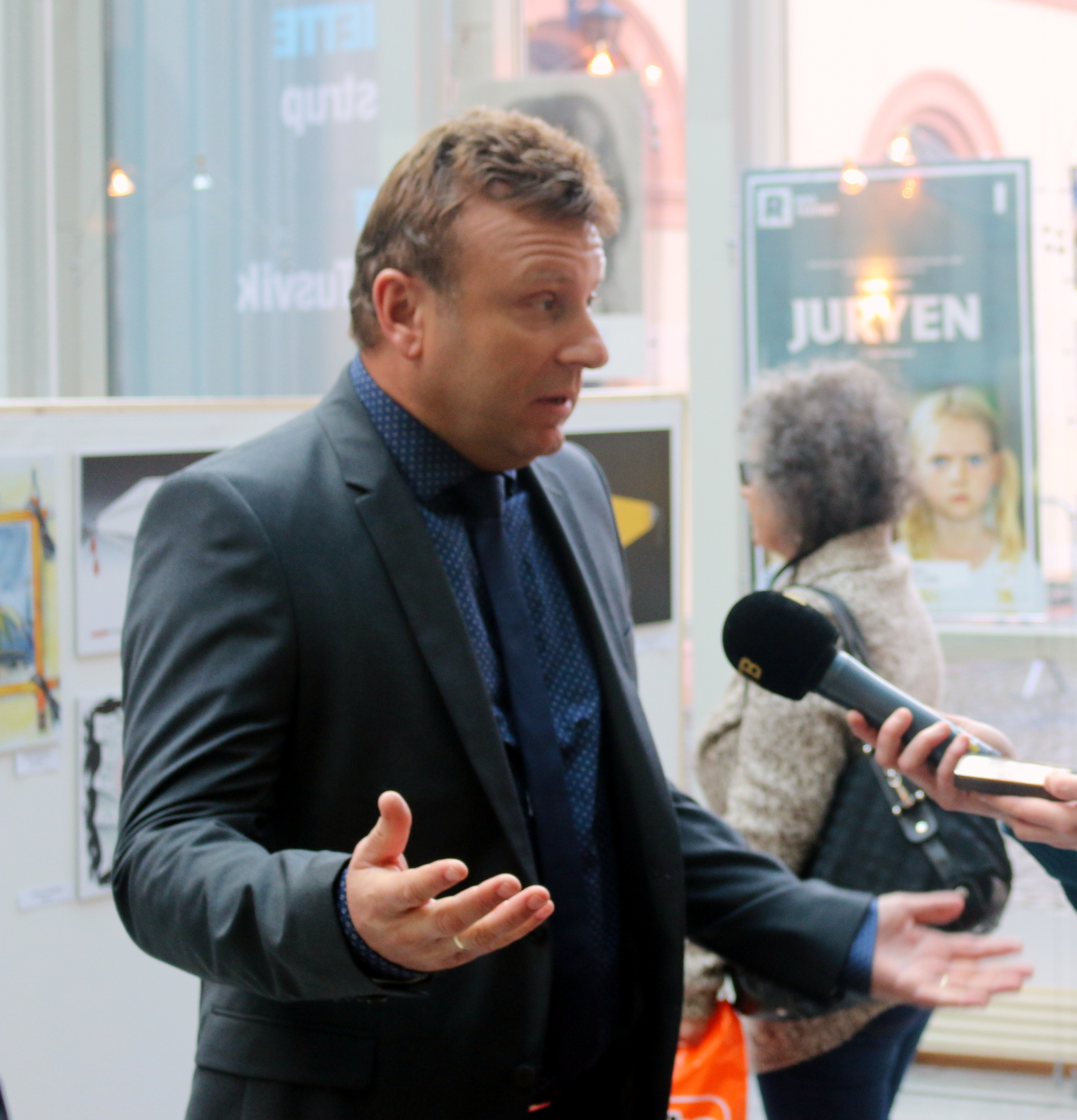
- Selbekk at a Je suis Charlie exhibition in 2015
- Born: 14 April 1969 (age 56); Trondheim, Norway
- Occupation: Newspaper editor
- Known for: Norwegian part of the Jyllands-Posten Muhammad cartoons controversy
- Awards: Fritt Ord Honorary Award, 2015

Vebjørn Selbekk (born 14 April 1969) is a Norwegian newspaper editor and author. Selbekk became widely known in Norway and abroad after he in 2006 reprinted a facsimile of the Jyllands-Posten Muhammad cartoons as editor of the Christian newspaper Magazinet (now Dagen), sparking a major incident and ensuing controversy. He has since been awarded by the free press organization Fritt Ord for his "firm defence of freedom of expression". Since 2015 he has been a member of the Broadcasting Council of the Norwegian public broadcaster NRK.

== Early life, education and work ==
Born in Trondheim, Selbekk grew up in Meråker Municipality in Nord-Trøndelag. His mother grew up in East Germany, until the family fled and she was sent to Trondheim as a nine-year old. Selbekk has a cand.mag. degree from the University of Trondheim in history, Christianity and social science. He has attended Livets Ord's Bible school in Uppsala, Sweden, and was for many years an important figure of the Norwegian charismatic free church movement. In 2010 he joined the mainline Church of Norway.

Selbekk started his career as a journalist for the local paper Stjørdalens Blad in the 1980s. In 1989 he became chief editor of the Oslo-based conservative Christian newspaper Magazinet, editing the paper until it merged with the older Bergen-based Christian newspaper Dagen in 2008, taking the name DagenMagazinet. He was societal editor of DagenMagazinet until 2010, when he became chief editor of the paper. Since 2011 the newspaper has again been published under the name Dagen. In 2015 he was appointed as a member of the Broadcasting Council of the Norwegian public broadcaster NRK. He is a self-described Christian Zionist, supporting the state of Israel from a Christian as well as secular perspectives. He is strongy against the European Union. His father was a local elected member of the Christian People's party.

== The Muhammad cartoons ==
Selbekk came under global media attention after 9 January 2006, when as chief editor of Magazinet he reprinted facsimiles of the Jyllands-Posten Muhammad cartoons as part of a news story about debate around the publication of the cartoons in Denmark. Many Muslims expressed outrage against the drawings, and the publications eventually sparked violent protests in the Middle East, including against the Norwegian embassy in Damascus, Syria which was set on fire, and Norwegian flags being burned in the Gaza Strip. In Norway, Khalid Mohammad, leader of the Al-Jinnah Foundation filed charges of blasphemy against Selbekk to the police. Selbekk privately received numerous death threats, and was forced to go into hiding with body guards and police protection.

He released the book Truet av islamister later that year, which chronicled the events, and criticized Norwegian authorities' handling of the case. The publication of the cartoons had sparked fierce debate in Norway as well, and after the Norwegian embassy in Syria was set on fire, Norwegian Prime Minister Jens Stoltenberg said that Selbekk had a "co-responsibility" for the attacks. Norwegian Foreign Minister Jonas Gahr Støre expressed understanding for the reactions in Muslim countries, and apologized for the unrest the cartoons had sparked. After pressure from the Norwegian government, Selbekk agreed to publicly apologize "if he had hurt someone's feelings", although he later regretted the decision which he says was taken under immense pressure. Selbekk has strongly criticized what he has described as being singled out as a "public enemy", making him a "legitimate target" amid death threats against himself and his family.

Selbekk has otherwise also consistently published images and cartoons considered offensive to both Christians and Jews when relevant for news stories, both before and after the Muhammad cartoon crisis. He believes that as long as there is news relevance, images should be published regardless if someone could be offended or disagree with it.

In 2015, Selbekk was awarded the Honorary Award of the free press Fritt Ord organization, together with culture editor of Jyllands-Posten during the crisis, Flemming Rose. The two editors were "honoured for their firm defence of freedom of expression throughout 10 years of caricature controversy."

== Authorship ==
Selbekk has written several books:

- 2001: Jødehat på norsk ("Norwegian Jew-hatred") ISBN 82-7341-936-3
- 2006: Truet av islamister ("Threatened by Islamists"), about the events surrounding the publication of the Muhammad caricatures. ISBN 82-476-0332-2
- 2007: T.B. Barratt - forfulgt og etterfulgt. ("T.B. Barratt - persecuted and followed") ISBN 978-82-302-0422-1
- 2013: Korset og Davidsstjernen - Norge jødene og Israel fra 1814 til idag ("The Cross and the Star of David - Norway, the Jews and Israel from 1814 until today") ISBN 9788247604298
- 2016: Fryktens makt ("The power of fear") ISBN 9788203295812

== See also ==
- William Nygaard
