= Kaltio =

Finnish cultural magazine

- Editor-in-chief: Paavo J. Heinonen
- Categories: Cultural magazine
- Frequency: Bimonthly
- Founder: Atte Kalajoki; Reino Rinne
- Founded: 1945
- First issue: April 1945; 80 years ago
- Country: Finland
- Based in: Oulu
- Language: Finnish
- Website: Kaltio
- ISSN: 0355-4511
- OCLC: 649248698

Kaltio is a bimonthly Finnish cultural magazine based in Oulu, Finland. It has been in circulation since 1945 making it one of the earliest magazines in Finland. In fact, it is the only national cultural magazine that has been published regularly outside the Helsinki Metropolitan Area for a long time. The title of the magazine is a reference to a spring specific to the region which always has fresh water.

== History and profile ==
Kaltio was started in Spring 1945 by two journalists and war veterans Atte Kalajoki and Reino Rinne in Oulu. The purpose in establishing the magazine was to reconstruct the culture of Northern Finland or Lapland following World War II. Atte Kalajoki is also founding editor-in-chief of the magazine which he held until 1963. The first issue appeared in April 1945. Between 1953 and 1954, Kaltio published articles in German, English and Danish. The magazine covered the text-based articles published in black-and-white until 1999 when it was redesigned as a full colour publication. Since then the covers of Kaltio have featured Northern Finnish artists and their work.

Kaltio is published six times per year. The tone and style of the magazine have varied based on the approaches of its editors-in-chief. The magazine has attempted to remain neutral in terms of politics, but during the editorship of Turo Manninen between 1967 and 1972 Kaltio was close to left-wing movements. The other editors-in-chief of the magazine include Tuomo Jämsä (1984–1986), Tuure Holopainen (1988–1995) and Martti T. Asunmaa (1973–1983). Another editor-in-chief was Jussi Vilkun who served in the post during the early 2000s. He was removed from the post in February 2006 when he allowed to publish a cartoon featuring the Prophet Muhammad in the website of Kaltio. Following the publication of this caricature some companies ended their advertisement contracts with the magazine. As of 2020 Paavo J. Heinonen was the editor-in-chief of the magazine since 2010.

As of 2006 Kaltio had nearly 2,000 subscribers in Finland.
