= Gair Rhydd =

Student newspaper of Cardiff University

- Type: Free, fortnightly newspaper
- Format: Tabloid
- Owner: Cardiff University Students' Union
- Editor: Ruaidhrí Gillen Lynch
- Founded: 1972
- Language: English and Welsh
- Headquarters: Cardiff University Students' Union, Cardiff
- Website: gairrhydd.com

Gair Rhydd (Welsh: [ˈɡair ˈr̥iːð], meaning "free word"; stylised in lowercase) is the official student newspaper of Cardiff University. Gair Rhydd is a member of Cardiff Student Media, and is funded by Cardiff Students' Union (CSU). Gair Rhydd is managed by Elaine Morgan, but the editorial team is composed of student volunteers.

Its sections cover local news, politics, student opinions, entertainment media, sport, and campus and Cardiff city life. It also features a Welsh-language section called Taf-od.

== History ==
Gair Rhydd was formed as part of the merger between University College Cardiff (UCC) and the University of Wales Institute of Science and Technology (UWIST). UCC students previously produced a student newspaper called Broadsheet, a direct predecessor to Gair Rhydd. W was produced from 1946 to 1971. The paper was founded by students John Hartley and Dave Aldridge, stating in the first editorial that the purpose behind the paper aimed to be "free because you don't pay for it, and free because you can say what you want in it".

The paper was one of the UK's earliest adopters of the World Wide Web when they began publishing issues online in 1993 after former editor John Rostron was made aware of the possibility by a student from the university's maths department.

The newspaper has won several student media awards, including Newspaper of the Year at the Guardian Student Media Awards 2005, Best Student Publication in Wales 2023, and second place at the Student Publication Awards for its design in 2025.

In 2018, the National Eisteddfod was led by student journalists from Cardiff University. To commemorate this, Gair Rhydd worked in conjunction with the event to release an all-Welsh issue of the newspaper, for the first time in their print history. This edition was released into print for issue #1118, on 10 August 2018.

== Controversies ==
Former editor Tom Wellingham and two other student journalists were suspended when, on 4 February 2006, they reproduced a controversial cartoon depicting Mohammed. The issue was withdrawn from publication (98% of copies retrieved) within a day of being released, and the Cardiff University Students' Union issued an apology. Cartoons were reinstated as a regular feature in issue #1081 in 2016.

In 2026, the newspaper was under fire after an article was published both online and in print issue #1215 on 9 February 2026. The article's title and select choice of vocabulary relating to the term "Senghetto"– a documented term referring to the poor quality of accommodation provided to those living in Senghennyd Court – came under scrutiny by the UMCC, who argued that the article "underplays the history of the term". Gair Rhydd's editorial leadership at the time responded, noting that the article had been reviewed by Cardiff Students' Union and was found not to be in breach of the media code Gair Rhydd is bound by, and that the UMMC had "misrepresented" the article by framing it as an attack against the Welsh language. Gair Rhydd maintained that the article was no such attack, arguing that its conclusion supported the same position held by UMCC.
