= The Cadre (newspaper) =

University student newspaper

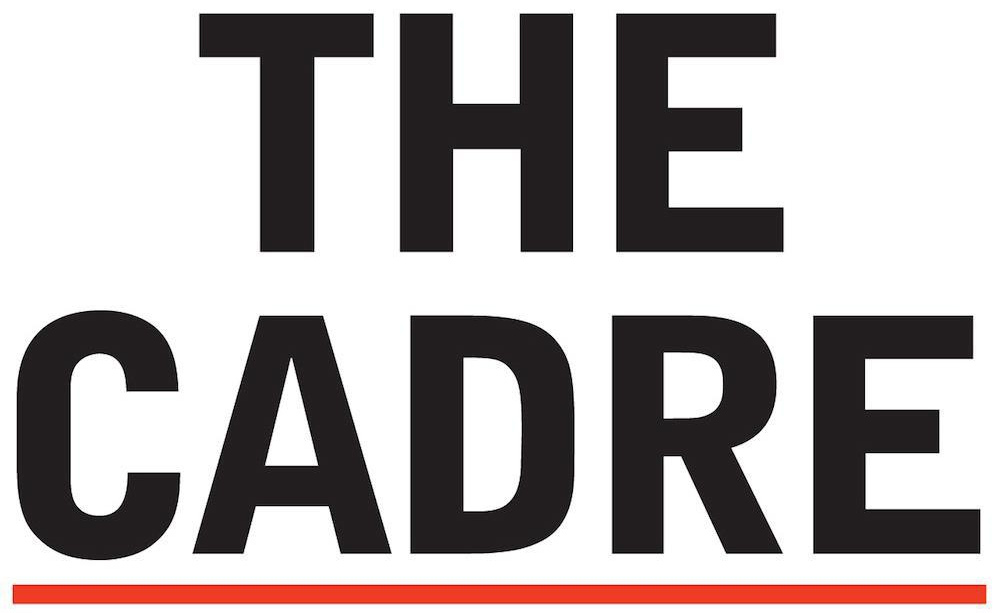
- Type: Student newspaper
- Format: Online and Print
- Owner: UPEI Student Union
- Publisher: UPEI Student Union
- Editor-in-chief: Syed Imran Ali
- Ceased publication: 2012 (print)
- Headquarters: Charlottetown, Prince Edward Island
- Website: thecadreupei.com

The Cadre is the student-run newspaper at University of Prince Edward Island in Charlottetown, Prince Edward Island.

== Operations ==
The Cadre moved to an online-only publication model in 2012. In 2022, Editor-in-Chief Jake MacCallum reinstated the Cadre's print publication. Print publications are released weekly during the fall and winter semesters at UPEI, with online publications occurring more frequently.

The Cadre currently publishes the following sections: News, Features, Arts & Culture, Humour, and Opinion. It won a JHM Award for humour writing at the 2018 NASH Conference in Toronto, hosted by the Canadian University Press.

== History ==
=== Controversy ===
In December 2002, The Cadre published an article entitled "Christfucking Christmas", a satirical article that was written to address the issue of consumerism during the Christmas season that had references to suicide, murder and rape. The headline offended enough people to have support for The Cadre withdrawn by the UPEI Student Union. The Editor in Chief was replaced, and from that point on, the UPEI Student Union took a more active role in the paper, as they were liable for the content printed as publishers of The Cadre.

In Fall 2004, The Cadre's Editor in Chief quit over demands from Student Union executive to not allow The Cadre to accept advertisements from other bars in Charlottetown that would conflict with the operation of the Student Union run bar, The Wave.

The paper drew harsh criticism when it became the first North American publication to print the offensive Muhammad cartoons from the Jyllands-Posten. The administration ordered that copies of the paper be removed from circulation on campus, as "publication of the caricatures represents a reckless invitation to public disorder and humiliation. The University acknowledges the debates about press freedom and responsibility generated by this matter."

In Spring 2014, The Cadre came under fire for publishing an article criticizing students' clothing during a beach-themed event. They later added an amendment saying it was a satirical piece. The amendment caused further controversy as many students felt it was a cop-out justification for publishing what many saw as a mean spirited and offensive piece. The article was pulled less than 72 hours after being published.

=== Autonomy ===
In January 2007, the UPEI Student Union acknowledged that The Cadre needed renewal, and established a committee to address this issue. On March 11, 2007, their report was delivered to UPEI Student Union Council for consideration. Some members of the committee recommended merging The Cadre with the UPEI Independent Student Media Society (UPEI ISM) so that the paper may become autonomous, and benefit from the advancements in new media that UPEI ISM had made at UPEI. The Cadre vocally opposed this move, claiming this was another case of media convergence. Others have claimed that The Cadre has suffered from the proliferation of citizen journalism through personal channels and social networking websites such as Facebook, and must increase its relevance by using new mediums to communicate, as UPEI ISM has through services such as ECMA Interactive.

The aforementioned committee was restructured, removing direct UPEI ISM representation and adding one editor representative from The Cadre as well as a staff member at large, as well as a working print journalist from the local community and two council members. The new committee was given until December, 2007 to explore all options for renewal of The Cadre, autonomy being one of them.

== See also ==
- List of student newspapers in Canada
- List of newspapers in Canada
