= Dagen (Norwegian newspaper) =

Norwegian Christian newspaper

Dagen is a Norwegian Christian newspaper established in 1919, and published in Bergen. The average circulation in 2004 was 5,307 copies. The ideological goal of the newspaper was "to influence society from a revival Christian point of view". On 1 January 2008 the newspaper merged with another Christian newspaper, Magazinet, and was renamed to DagenMagazinet. On 1 April 2011 DagenMagazinet was renamed to Dagen. The current chief editor of Dagen as of 2010 is Vebjørn Selbekk, former editor of Magazinet.

Magazinet became known to a wider audience in January 2006, when it was the first newspaper in Norway to reprint the Jyllands-Posten Muhammad cartoons which, according to the editor, was done in the name of freedom of speech. The printing of these drawings resulted in attacks on Norwegian installations in some parts of the Muslim world.

In 2019, Dagen purchased Korsets Seier, the publication of the Pentecostal Church in Norway.

The newspaper is dependent on economic support from the Norwegian Government.
