= Nigel Planer =

British actor, comedian and writer (born 1953)

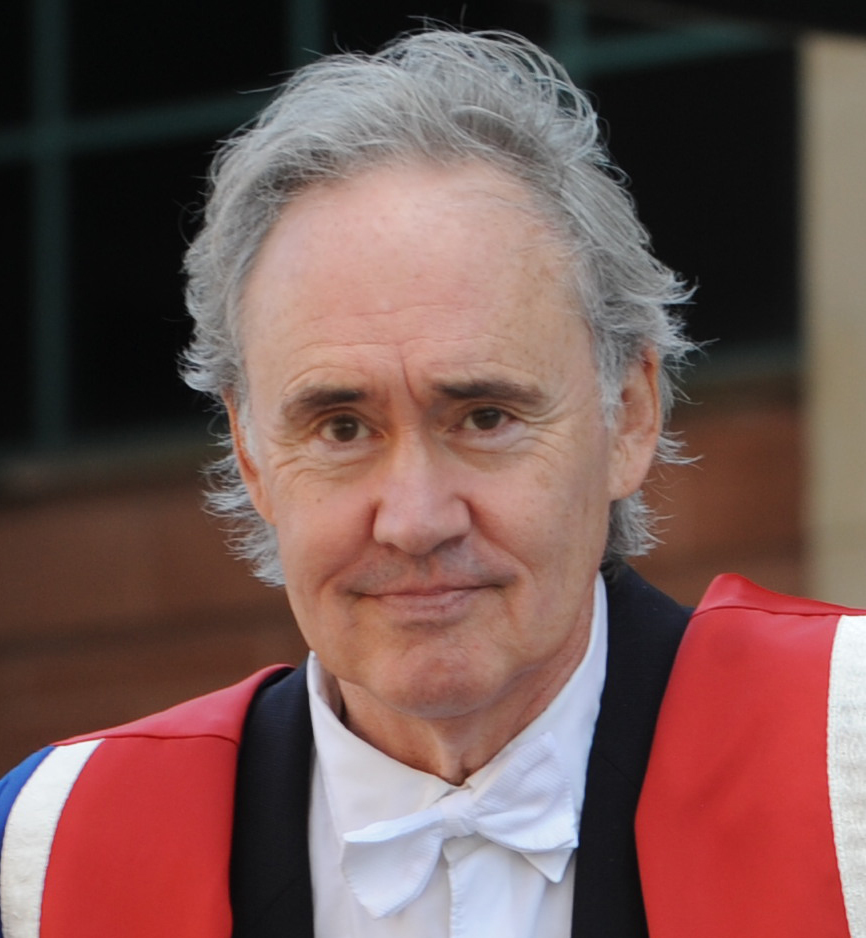
- Planer after receiving his Honorary Doctor of Arts degree from Edinburgh Napier University in 2011
- Born: Nigel George Planer; 22 February 1953 (age 73); Westminster, London, England
- Occupations: Actor; comedian; musician; novelist; playwright
- Years active: 1977–present
- Spouses: Anna Lea (m. 1989; div. 1995); Frankie Park (m. 1999; div. 2003); Roberta Green (m. 2013)

Nigel George Planer (born 22 February 1953) is a British actor, writer and musician. His television credits include playing Neil in the sitcom The Young Ones, Ralph Filthy in the sitcom Filthy, Rich and Catflap and narrating the children's animated series Grizzly Tales for Gruesome Kids. He has appeared in many West End musicals, including as part of the original casts of Evita, Chicago, We Will Rock You, Wicked, and Charlie and the Chocolate Factory. He has also appeared in Hairspray. He won a BRIT award in 1984 and has been nominated for Olivier, TMA, WhatsOnStage, and BAFTA awards.

== Early life ==
Nigel Planer is the son of Dr George and Lesley Planer and was brought up in Mortlake, London. He has two brothers, Geoffrey and Roger, a businessman and a musician, respectively. His father, George (d. 2016), established a company that pioneered technology in controlled-rate freezers, IVF and stem cell research. His mother, Lesley (d. 2000), was a speech therapist. Nigel attended Westminster School in central London, where he wrote a satirical play about the school with fellow pupil Stephen Poliakoff. He began a degree course in African and Asian Studies at the University of Sussex, but dropped out to study acting at the London Academy of Music and Dramatic Art.

== Career ==
Planer was a founding member of the London Comedy Store and The Comic Strip – pioneers of the alternative comedy movement in the United Kingdom. Planer appeared with Peter Richardson as part of the double act "The Outer Limits". Planer and Richardson also wrote the That's Life! parody on Not the Nine O'Clock News. With Christopher Douglas, he created the spoof actor character Nicholas Craig, who appears in book, radio, TV and article form as well as live; including, in 2011, in Stewart Lee's At Last! The 1981 Show at the Royal Festival Hall, London, and in 2022 in Nicholas Craig's Podcom. Planer is also the author of several books, plays, radio plays and TV scripts as well as a small volume of poetry. He was awarded an honorary Doctor of Arts degree by Edinburgh Napier University in June 2011.

=== Television ===
Planer is best known for his role as Neil, the hippie housemate in the BBC comedy The Young Ones, which ran for two series broadcast in 1982 and 1984. He has starred in The Comic Strip Presents..., (and was a writer for) a series of short films broadcast from 1982 onwards, on Channel 4.

In 2003, Planer played Professor Dumbledore in a Harry Potter parody, Harry Potter and the Secret Chamber Pot of Azerbaijan. He appeared on a BBC Four programme in the guise of Nicholas Craig in 2007, in which he was interviewed by Mark Lawson.

Planer guest-starred in "The Pale Horse", a 2010 episode of Agatha Christie's Marple. He played Peter Mandelson in The Hunt for Tony Blair (2011).

Leading roles on television include Shine on Harvey Moon, The Young Ones, Filthy Rich and Catflap, The Grimleys, King and Castle, Bonjour La Classe and Roll Over, Beethoven. He also starred in Michael Palin's Number 27, Simon Gray's Two Lumps of Ice, Emma Tennant's Frankenstein's Baby, Blackeyes, by Dennis Potter, Marcella, Cockroaches, Ratburger, and Loaded.

Planer's guest appearances include Lockwood & Co, Inside No. 9, The Bill, French and Saunders, Jonathan Creek, Blackadder III, The Last Detective, The Paul Merton Show, The Lenny Henry Show, Death in Paradise, Songs from the Shows, This is Jinsy, Boomers, Father Brown, M.I. High, Grantchester, There She Goes, and Episodes.

=== Film ===
Planer has appeared in films, including Flood, Virgin Territory, Bright Young Things, Terry Pratchett's Hogfather, The Colour of Magic, The Wind in the Willows, The Land Girls, Clockwork Mice, Carry On Columbus, Brazil, The Supergrass, I Give It a Year, Burn, Burn, Burn, The List and Yellowbeard.

=== Theatre ===
His first break in the theatre was understudying David Essex as Che Guevara in the original West End run of Evita.

In 1990, he replaced Michael Gambon in Alan Ayckbourn's Man of the Moment in the West End. Leading roles followed in other productions at the Bush Theatre, the Lyric Theatre, the Traverse, the Young Vic, the West Yorkshire Playhouse, Regent's Park Open-Air Theatre, Chichester Festival Theatre, Plymouth Drum and the Hampstead Theatre. For the 1993 English National Opera Christmas season he played the jailor Frosch in Die Fledermaus.

Planer was in the original cast playing Amos Hart for the 1997 London revival of Chicago. He was a member of the original West End cast of his co-star Ben Elton's Queen musical, playing Pop in We Will Rock You.

In 2006, he played the part of the narrator in The Rocky Horror Show. He then starred alongside Idina Menzel, at the Apollo Victoria Theatre on 27 September 2006, as The Wizard in the original West End production of Wicked.

He took over the role of Wilbur, opposite Michael Ball, in the West End production of Hairspray on 2 February 2009.

He featured in Doctor Who: Live touring the UK, as Vorgenson The Inter-Galactic Showman, before appearing in pantomime as Captain Hook at the Lyceum Theatre in Sheffield.

Planer went on to star as Grandpa Joe in the original production of Charlie and the Chocolate Factory, which opened in London's West End in 2013 for which he was nominated for an Olivier Award for best supporting actor in a musical.

From September 2018 to November 2018, Planer toured with Ade Edmondson in a play that they wrote together called Vulcan 7.

In 2020 he took on the role of Grandpa in the arena tour of David Walliams' Grandpa's Great Escape.

=== Music ===
Planer played Den Dennis, one of the four members of the 1980s spoof rock band Bad News, which made two albums produced by Brian May. The band performed at the Hammersmith Apollo and the Donington and Reading rock festivals.

As Neil from The Young Ones, Planer gained a number-two hit single in 1984 with "Hole in My Shoe" (originally a hit for 1960s band Traffic), which won him a Brit Award. After that, an album was produced by Dave Stewart, Neil's Heavy Concept Album. Planer also took Neil's stage act on the road in that year as Neil in the "Bad Karma in The UK" tour. This culminated in a month-long run at the Edinburgh Festival Fringe and a night at The Hammersmith Apollo, London. The Young Ones also appeared on Cliff Richard's 1986 charity rerecording of "Living Doll", which spent three weeks at number one in the UK. He has a silver and a gold disc from his musical career. In 2015 he started a new music project, Rainsmoke, with Chris Wade and Roger Planer.

In 2021 Planer released several of his own musical projects. "Five Songs Left" and "Four Songs More", collaborations with Chris Wade, are Nick Drake-inspired folk songs he wrote in 1971, when he was 18. He also released two singles written more recently: "City in the Summer", a jazz song about the hot summer of Covid-19, and "Love Strikes". He has written lyrics for "Commit No Nuisance", a music collaboration with Neil Avery ("Talk it Out", one of the songs from the album, aims to encourage male mental-health awareness), and for Swedish rocker Matts Lindblom.

=== Voice acting ===
Planer was the reader of the first unabridged audiobook editions of many of Terry Pratchett's Discworld novels. He also appeared in the television adaptations of Terry Pratchett's Hogfather and The Colour of Magic, and performed as a voice artist in the games Discworld 2 and Discworld Noir. Discworld Audiobooks narrated by Planer include (with number in parentheses indicating order of the book in the Discworld series):

- The Colour of Magic (1)
- The Light Fantastic (2)
- Mort (4)
- Sourcery (5)
- Wyrd Sisters (6)
- Pyramids (7)
- Guards! Guards! (8)
- Moving Pictures (10)
- Reaper Man (11)
- Witches Abroad (12)
- Small Gods (13)
- Lords and Ladies (14)
- Men at Arms (15)
- Soul Music (16)
- Interesting Times (17)
- Maskerade (18)
- Feet of Clay (19)
- Hogfather (20)
- Jingo (21)
- The Last Continent (22)
- Carpe Jugulum (23)

Other voice roles include the narrator of Grizzly Tales for Gruesome Kids (and the audiobook narrator for Fearsome Tales for Fiendish Kids), for which he received a BAFTA nomination, the title character in 2 series of Romuald the Reindeer, and Dr. Marmalade in an episode of SpongeBob SquarePants (alongside Young Ones co-stars Christopher Ryan and Rik Mayall). Planer has also been the narrator of many of BBC Four's Britannia series of documentaries, including Prog Rock Britannia, Blues Britannia and Heavy Metal Britannia. He voiced Frodo in The Adventures of Tom Bombadil from the 1992 radio series Tales from the Perilous Realm. He was a narrator in a direct-to-video version of Val Biro's Gumdrop book series in 1994. He narrated as a thirty-something Adrian Mole in the radio adaptation of Adrian Mole: The Cappuccino Years.

In 2018, he voiced the character of Henry Davenant Hythe in the Big Finish Productions original production Jeremiah Bourne in Time, which he also wrote.

In the 1990s, he also narrated an audiobook version of Roger and the Rottentrolls, by Tim Firth and Gordon Firth, before the television series premiered.

== Writing ==
Planer has written books, stage plays, TV shows, radio plays and newspaper articles as well as 105 episodes of The New Magic Roundabout.

=== Books ===
- Neil’s Book of the Dead 1984 (with Terence Blacker)
- I an actor: Nicholas Craig 1988 (with Christopher Douglas)
- A Good Enough Dad 1992
- Let’s Get Divorced 1994 (with Terence Blacker)
- Therapy and How to Avoid it 1996 (with Robert Llewellyn)
- Unlike The Buddha 1997
- The Right Man 2000
- Faking It 2003
- Jeremiah Bourne in Time 2023
- Making Other Plans 2023
- Young Once: A Life Less Heavy 2025 (memoir)
- Travelling Light 2026

=== Plays ===
- On the Ceiling 2008
- Death of Long Pig 2009
- The Magnificent Andrea 2011
- Game of Love and Chai 2018
- Vulcan 7 2018 (with Adrian Edmondson)
- She Devil! (Workshop production) 2019
- All Above Board 2021

== Credits ==
His television comedy and satire work includes:

- Boom Boom...Out Go The Lights (1981, TV Special) as Self
- Shine on Harvey Moon (1982–1995, TV Series) as Lou Lewis
- The Young Ones (1982–1984, TV Series) as Neil / E.T. Fairfax / Famine / Dino / Fly #2
- Yellowbeard (1983) as Mansell
- The Comic Strip Presents… (1983–2012, TV Series)
- Roll Over Beethoven (1985, TV Series) as Nigel Cochrane
- Brazil (1985) as Charlie – Dept. of Works
- King and Castle (1986–1988, TV Series) as David Castle
- Filthy Rich & Catflap (1987, TV Series) as Ralph Filthy
- Eat the Rich (1987) as DHSS Manager
- Blackadder the Third (1987) as Lord Smedley, fop
- Blackeyes (1989, TV Mini-Series, by Dennis Potter) as Jeff
- French & Saunders (1990, TV Series) as Andy
- Frankenstein's Baby (1990, TV Series) as Paul Hocking
- Nicholas Craig – The Naked Actor (1990–1992, TV Series) as Nicholas Craig
- Nicholas Craig's Interview Masterclass (1990, TV Series) as Nicholas Craig
- Oh, No! Not THEM! (1990, TV Movie) as Neil
- Nicholas Craig's Masterpiece Theatre (1992) as Nicholas Craig
- The Nicholas Craig Masterclass (1992) as Nicholas Craig
- Carry On Columbus (1992) as The Wazir
- The Magic Roundabout (1992, English adaptation and narrator on previously unseen episodes)
- Bonjour la Classe (1993, TV Series) as Laurence Didcott
- Sherlock Holmes (1993, TV Mini-Series) as Inspector Hopkins
- Let's Get Divorced (1994)
- Wake Up! With Libby And Jonathan (1994, TV Special short) as Jonathan Hughes
- Clockwork Mice (1995) as Parkey
- Diana & Me (1997) as Taxi Driver
- The Grimleys (1997–2001, TV Series) as Baz Grimley
- Jonathan Creek (1997–2013, TV Series) as Franklin Tartikoff / Shelford
- The Land Girls (1998) as Gerald
- Grizzly Tales for Gruesome Kids (2000–2007, TV Series) as Narrator (voice)
- Bright Young Things (2003) as Taxi Driver
- Wicked (2006–2008, West End Musical)
- SpongeBob SquarePants (2006) – Dr. Marmalade (voice)
- Terry Pratchett's Hogfather (2006, TV Movie) as Mr. Sideney
- Flood (2007) as Keith Hopkins
- Virgin Territory (2007) as Uncle Bruno
- Terry Pratchett's The Colour of Magic (2008, TV Mini-Series) as Arch Astronomer
- Hairspray (2009)
- M.I.High (2009, TV Series) as Prime Minister
- Episodes (2012–2015, TV Series) as Sanford Shamiro
- I Give It a Year (2013) as Brian
- The List (2013) as Ted Rove
- Charlie and the Chocolate Factory (musical) (2013)
- Boomers (2014–2016, TV Series) as Mick
- Cockroaches (2015, TV Series) as Stevie
- Burn Burn Burn (2015) as Henry
- Grantchester (2016, TV Series) as Giles Montgomery
- Seven Days in Never (2017) (voice)
- Ratburger (2017, TV Movie) as Headmaster
- Loaded (2017, TV Series) as Mr. Young
- Death in Paradise (2018, TV Series) as Eugene Sutton
- Upstart Crow (2018, TV Series) as Lord Egeus.
- Inside No. 9 (2018, TV Series) as Frank (episode "Tempting Fate")
- Marcella (2018, TV Series) as Reg Reynolds
- Vulcan 7 (2018)
- There She Goes (2018–2020, TV Series) as Gandalf
- Father Brown (2019, TV Series) as Ronnie Grunion
- Grandpa’s Great Escape Arena Tour (2019)
- Lockwood & Co. (2023, TV Series) as Sir John Fairfax
- Not Going Out (2026, TV Series) as himself
- Merry Christmas Aubrey Flint (2026) as Ned

=== Discography ===
- Evita (Original London Cast Recording) 1978
- "Hole in My Shoe" (1984)
- Neil's Heavy Concept Album (1984)
- Rollover Beethoven. (Songs from the original TV series) 1985
- "Living Doll" (1986)
- Rough with the Smooth( 1986)
- Bad News (1987)
- Bad News Bootleg (1988)
- Bad News The Cash in Compilation (1992)
- The Last Night (1993)
- Chicago cast recording (1995)
- The Dreaded Lurgie (1998)
- Three Men in a Boat (1999)
- Adrian Mole the Cappuccino Years (2000)
- There was also a soundtrack to The Grimleys (2000), Planer's character appearing on the album.
- We Will Rock You (The Original London Cast Recording) (2002)
- Cabaret (2005)
- The Robe of Skulls (2008)
- Charlie and the Chocolate Factory (The Original London Cast Recording) (2013)
- Five Songs Left (2020)
- City in the Summer (2020) – single
- Four Songs More (2021)
- Love Strikes (2021) – single
- Phoning Home From Away (2021) – single
- The Last Ten Yards (2021) – single
