= Fairy godmother =

Archetype

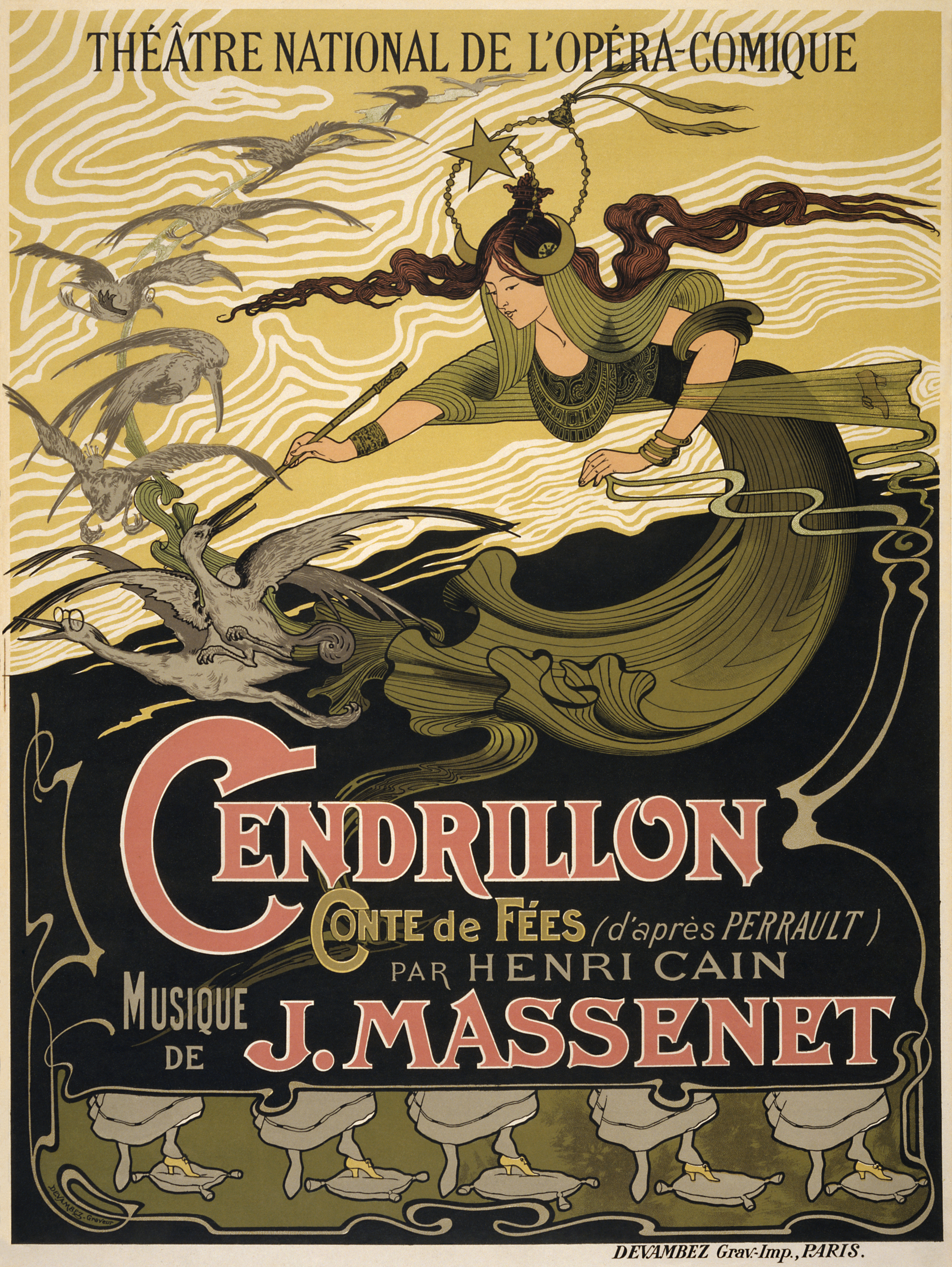
Poster for Jules Massenet's Cendrillon (based on Perrault's Cinderella) showing the titular character's fairy godmother.

In fairy tales, a fairy godmother (French: fée marraine; Spanish: Hada Madrina) is a fairy with magical powers who acts as a mentor or surrogate parent to someone, in the role that an actual godparent was expected to play in many societies. The fairy godmother is a special case of the donor.

Rather than stemming from folklore, these figures come from the fairy tales of précieuses, and their presence there influenced many later tales and fantasy based on fairy tales.

== Fairy tales and legends ==
Actual fairy godmothers are rare in fairy tales but became familiar figures because of the popularity of the literary fairy tales of Madame d'Aulnoy and other précieuses, and Charles Perrault. Many other supernatural patrons feature in fairy tales; these include various kinds of animals and the spirit of a dead mother. The fairy godmother has her roots in the figures of the Fates; this is especially clear in "Sleeping Beauty", where they decree her fate, and are associated with spinning.

In the tales of précieuses and later successors, the fairy godmother acts in a manner atypical of fairies in actual folklore belief; they are preoccupied with the character and fortunes of their human protegees, whereas fairies in folklore have their own interests.

Typically, the fairy godmother's protégé is a prince or princess, who is the protagonist of the story, and the godparent uses her magic to help or otherwise support them. The best known example is probably the fairy godmother in Charles Perrault's "Cinderella". Eight fairy godmothers appear in Sleeping Beauty in Charles Perrault's version and in the Grimm Brothers' version titled Little Briar Rose, the thirteen godmothers are called Wise Women. The popularity of these versions of these tales led to this being widely regarded as a common fairy-tale motif, although they are less common in other tales.

Indeed, the fairy godmothers were added to The Sleeping Beauty by Perrault; no such figures appeared in his source, "Sun, Moon, and Talia" by Giambattista Basile.

While fairy godmothers are traditionally portrayed as kind, gentle, and loving, there are exceptions. In "Sleeping Beauty" and "Little Briar Rose", a fairy not invited to the royal christening curses the eponymous princess to die from pricking her finger on a spindle, only for one of the invited fairies to alter the spell into a century-long slumber. In Gabrielle-Suzanne de Villeneuve's fairy tale "Beauty and the Beast", the Prince's evil fairy godmother had not only turned him into a Beast for rejecting her marriage proposal but had even attempted to seduce his uncle, a king whose daughter (Beauty) a good fairy switched at birth with a merchant's dead baby because said godmother tried to have the princess killed.

== Précieuses ==
In the works of the précieuses, French literary fairy tales, fairy godmothers act much as actual godmothers did among their social circles, exerting their benefits for their godchildren, but expecting respect in return.

Madame d'Aulnoy created a fairy godmother for the evil stepsister in her fairy tale The Blue Bird; in this position, the fairy godmother's attempts to bring about the marriage of her goddaughter and the hero are evil attempts to impede his marriage with the heroine. Likewise, in The White Doe, the fairy godmother helps the evil princess get revenge on the heroine. In Finette Cendron, the fairy godmother is the heroine's, but after helping her in the early portion of the tale, she is offended when Finette Cendron does not take her advice, and Finette must work through the second part with little assistance from her. Conversely, in Henriette-Julie de Murat's Bearskin, the heroine has a fairy godmother, but she is offended that the heroine's marriage was arranged without consulting her, and refuses to assist for some time, though eventually relenting.

== Modern fiction ==
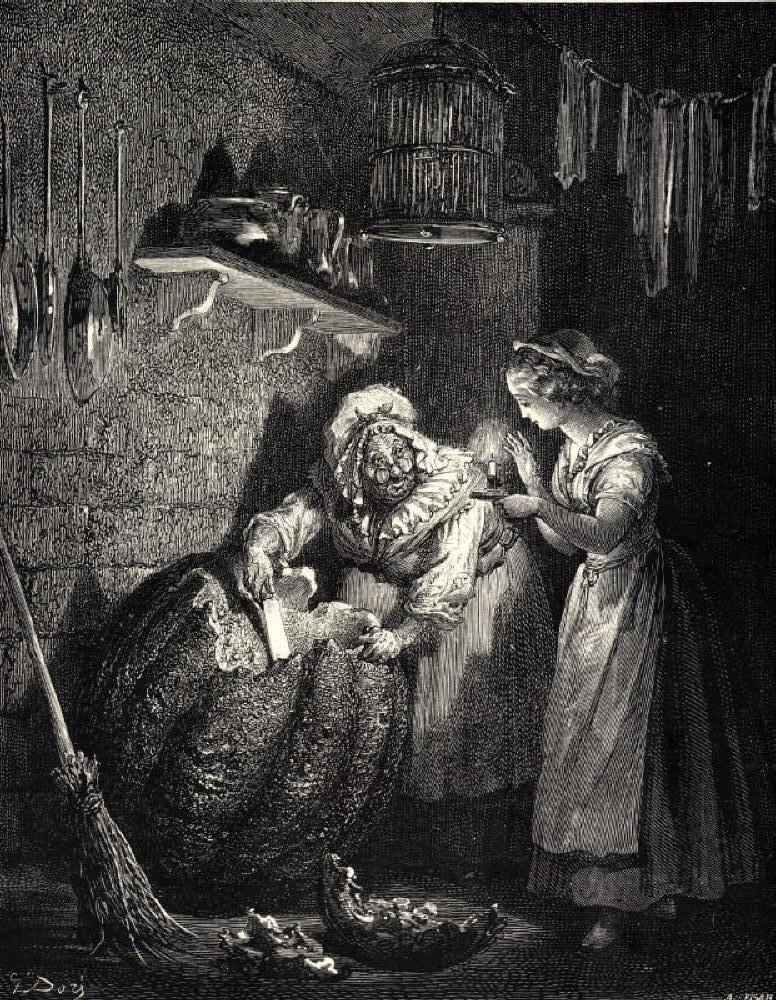
Illustration to Cinderella by Gustave Doré: the fairy godmother preparing an enchantment for her goddaughter Cinderella.

Fairy godmothers appear frequently in fairytale fantasy, especially comic versions and retellings of Cinderella and Sleeping Beauty. Mercedes Lackey presents a gently lampooned version of the concept in her Tales of the Five Hundred Kingdoms series, in which Fairy Godmothers are magically gifted women who monitor magical forces across the kingdoms. Whenever events are right for a fairy tale to recur, the relevant Fairy Godmother steps in to make sure that the tale in question runs its course with as few fatalities as possible.

- In William Makepeace Thackeray's The Rose and the Ring, the fairy Blackstick concludes that her gifts have not done her godchildren good; in particular, she has given two of her goddaughters the title ring and the title rose, which have the power to make whoever owns them beautiful, which have ruined the character of those goddaughters; with the next prince and princess, she gives them "a little misfortune", which proves the best gift, as their difficulties form their characters.
- In C. S. Lewis's The Magician's Nephew, when Uncle Andrew explains how he made the magical rings from dust left to him by his godmother, he points out that she may have had fairy blood, and so he might have been the last man to have a fairy godmother.
- In the novel Ella Enchanted by Gail Carson Levine and its film adaptation, the fairy godmother Lucinda is an obnoxious and incompetent woman with a reputation for giving terrible gifts, blessing the protagonist with the gift of "obedience" which forces her to immediately obey any instruction given to her.
- In the television animated Halloween special Witch's Night Out, the witch is mistaken for a "fairy godmother" by the two children, Small and Tender. Their sitter, Bazooey corrects them by addressing the fairy godmother as a "wicked witch".
- The Fairly OddParents is an animated comedy TV series where the fairies Cosmo and Wanda are (rather incompetent) godparents.
- In Shrek 2, the Fairy Godmother (voiced by Jennifer Saunders) who appears is a conniving, crooked businesswoman (with a personality rather like that of the Stepmother in Cinderella), who is quite willing to resort to blackmail and/or murder to further her interests. The pure reason for helping princesses gain a happily ever after with Prince Charming is the fact that Prince Charming is the Fairy Godmother's son, and through the marriage, he will gain the throne. She also said to Shrek that she strongly believes that ogres don't live happily ever after.
- In the Discworld novel Witches Abroad, fairy godmothers are a type of witch. The main antagonist is a plotting fairy godmother, Lady Lilith de Tempscire (Lily, the sister of witch Granny Weatherwax), who uses the power of stories and mirror magic to control the city of Genua. Magrat Garlick becomes fairy godmother to Ella Saturday (the rightful ruler of Genua) following the death of Desiderata Hollow but throws away the magic wand at the end (as she was unable to use it for any purpose other than turning objects into pumpkins).
- In The Dresden Files novels (primarily Grave Peril and Summer Knight), the main character, a modern wizard named Harry Dresden is revealed to have a faerie godmother by the name of Leanansidhe who enjoys ensnaring Harry in one-sided deals.
- Once Upon a Midnight features the character of Angelica, the Blue Fairy, an overzealous fairy godmother.
- Fairy Godmother plays a leading role in the web series Wish It Inc. She is portrayed by Portal voice actress Ellen McLain.
- The first King's Quest game features a fairy godmother of the main character Graham who can grant him invincibility.
- The otome game My Candy Love features a fairy godmother who will appear randomly and give the player gifts. She is a bit of an odd case in that she is implied to be an eccentric aunt who merely dresses as a fairy godmother.
- In the TV series True Blood, Season 4, Episode 1, the character Sookie learns of her fairy heritage, including that she has a godmother who is a blood relative on her fairy side.
- In the film Maleficent, Princess Aurora mistakenly assumes Maleficent to be her fairy godmother.
- In the fourth season of the superhero series Legends of Tomorrow, the team hunts magical creatures across time that have escaped from Mallus' realm. One of the creatures is Tabitha (portrayed by Jane Carr), the fairy godmother of a girl in 1692 in Salem, Massachusetts.

== See also ==
- Black Annis
- Crone
- Fairy
- Godparent
- Hag
- Pixie
- Queen (Snow White)
- Sea witch
- Wicked fairy godmother
- Witchcraft
- The Witch (fairy tale)
- Fairy Queen
