= Witches (Discworld) =

Major subset of the "Discworld" novels by Terry Pratchett

A major subset of the Discworld novels of Terry Pratchett involves the witches of Lancre. Appearing alone in 1987's Equal Rites, 'crone' Esme Weatherwax is joined in Wyrd Sisters by 'mother' Nanny Ogg and 'maiden' Magrat Garlick, and together can be seen as a spoof on the Three Witches in Shakespeare's Macbeth, and a tongue-in-cheek reinterpretation of the Neopagans' Triple Goddess. Granny Weatherwax "especially tends to give voice to the major themes of Pratchett's work."

== Overview ==
Witch magic is very different from the wizard magic taught in the Unseen University, and consists largely of finding clever and efficient ways to achieve the right results, often without using magic at all to do so. In contrast to wizard magic, witch magic relies more on common sense, hard work, and a peculiar brand of psychology known as headology, most commonly employed by Granny Weatherwax, and more commonly used on people.

Witch magic is less energy-intensive than wizard magic, which means that a witch can technically do more than an equally-powerful wizard. Also unlike wizards, witches do not make a big deal of their talents and look down on those who employ showy techniques and appearances. Witches unironically acting with melodrama, of which cackling is seen as an early sign, is often an indication of "going to the bad" and becoming a stereotypically wicked witch.

Another later addition to witch skills, established in Maskerade, but first named in the Tiffany Aching books, is First Sight—seeing what is really there instead of what one hopes to see, expects to see, or what others see—and Second Thoughts—thinking about the way one is thinking.

Though witches rarely use magic, a low-level form of magic employed frequently is a 'shamble', a handmade device or construct used by witches for such uses as detecting or amplifying magic, for protection (like a "curse net"), or for sending out a spell. The shamble itself is not seen as having magical properties, being instead something to employ magic through, and can only be made from scratch in the moment it is needed and used only once. A shamble, which can consist of any number of things, must contain something living, such as a fresh egg or a small insect.

Unlike wizard magic, which is taught en masse, witch magic is taught on a one-to-one basis by older witches to apprentices. Although magical talent tends to run in families, witches do not teach their daughters, feeling that this would cause a sort of magical inbreeding.

Discworld Voodoo is considered to be an aspect of witch magic, combined with a sort of do-it-yourself religion, relying heavily on the power of belief. The most powerful Discworld voodoo-women can deliberately create moderately powerful gods for a specific purpose.

Generally speaking, witches are women and wizards are men. Despite the opinions of wizards and witches on this subject (that systemization comes easier to men and intuition comes easier to women), there appears to be no reason for this beyond cultural bias. There has only ever been one female wizard on the main Discworld continent, as described in the events of Equal Rites. The island of Krull on the very Rim of the Disc does not mind female wizards but no one from the Circle Sea would ever admit they exist.

The role of witches has been defined as "smoothing out life's humps and bumps", and "helping people when life's on the edge", often taking the role of a village midwife, medicine woman and death doula. Witches do not accept payment for their services, but it is understood that witches will accept gifts of food, clean used clothing or old pairs of shoes in return for their help. Despite not receiving traditional payment for their services, there is considered pride in being a witch, and Granny Weatherwax emphasises at every possible opportunity that it is considered lucky to have a witch in your house, and that it would be especially lucky if the witch was well-provided for.

Many witches, especially in the Ramtops, have steadings, geographical areas and populations that they are responsible for. It is unclear how steadings are defined; Tiffany has the entire Chalk as a steading, while other witches have only two or three villages. Steadings are not necessarily passed on to the apprentice of the witch who previously watched over the steading. However, steadings have some geographical bearing, as a discussion of the older witches dying off leads reluctantly to discussing a redrawing of territorial boundaries; this appears to be the mutual widening of steadings by the witches due to fewer and fewer young girls becoming witches, necessitating more work being taken on by extant witches.

Witches tend to lead lonely lives; they are generally feared and respected rather than liked, and often perform their duties with little or no thanks from the populace at large. This leads some witches to become resentful of their charges, and to use their power against them. A witch who "goes to the bad" may initially not feel she is doing anything wrong, but will eventually lose it, resulting in abuses of magic that may lead to her own demise. Witches call this "cackling" and, to keep it at bay, they pay regular visits to one another to gossip and take tea, often travelling some considerable distance to do so.

At the climax of events in I Shall Wear Midnight, it is revealed that the local witch, as the witch of that area, also has powers and authority not unlike a Justice of the peace; they are able to perform binding marriage ceremonies, as well as judge and deal out punishment onto the deserving.

The main witches in the books are the Lancre Coven: Granny Weatherwax, Nanny Ogg, Magrat Garlick and later Agnes Nitt. A sub-series of young adult books introduced a new witch character, Tiffany Aching, who was gradually tied into the main witch storyline as her series continued.

Most fully qualified witches are known by the title of "Mistress". Senior witches, also known as 'Mistress', are known by honorary titles such as "Granny", "Nanny", "Nana", "Goodie/Goody", "Old Mother", etc.

The 'mottos' of Discworld witches (as mentioned in the Tiffany Aching books) include:

- Always facing what one fears
- Having just enough money, never too much, and some string always on one's person
- Even if is not one's fault, it is one's responsibility to deal with
- Witches deal with things, typically taken to mean taking ownership of a situation and finding a solution as best as one can
- Witches typically should not stand between two mirrors
- Avoiding cackling, and sliding into abuses of power
- Avoiding lying, though not necessarily having to be completely honest
- Never wishing, especially on stars
- Opening one's eyes, and then opening them again

== Works ==
Starting with Equal Rites in 1987, the major novels featuring the witches are:

- Equal Rites 1987
- Wyrd Sisters 1988
- Witches Abroad 1991
- Lords and Ladies 1992
- Maskerade 1995
- Carpe Jugulum 1998
- The Wee Free Men 2003 (Tiffany Aching)
- A Hat Full of Sky 2004 (Tiffany Aching)
- Wintersmith 2006 (Tiffany Aching)
- I Shall Wear Midnight 2010 (Tiffany Aching)
- The Shepherd's Crown 2015 (Tiffany Aching)

== Ramtops witches ==
The majority of Discworld Witches are seen in the Ramtops region of Discworld, and, barring the latest book in the Tiffany Aching series, the primary protagonists of the Witch books are from Lancre, a country in the Ramtops region.

=== The Lancre Coven ===
The Lancre Coven is, as mentioned above, the main group of witches in the Discworld novels, and the ones featured in the novels referred to as "The Witches series".

They began as a parody of the Three Witches in Macbeth, and also as a reworking of the Maiden, Mother and Crone archetypes (the Triple Goddess). It could also be said that they each represent a different stereotype of witches: Granny is the classic fairy tale witch, Nanny the village wise woman and Magrat the modern romantic Wiccan.

It has been explained in the books that three witches are required for a coven. Two witches get on each other's nerves; the third one can get them to make up, so they can all get on the nerves of everyone else. If a coven has more than three members, they all get on each other's nerves. (It is also mentioned that the true collective noun for a group of witches is not "coven", but "argument".)

==== Magrat Garlick ====
Magrat Garlick is the daughter of Simplicity Garlick, granddaughter of Araminta Garlick and niece of Yvonnel Garlick. She was the original Maiden in the Lancre coven, which consisted of herself, Granny Weatherwax and Nanny Ogg. She is often described as "a wet hen", generally by Granny Weatherwax. Magrat believes in crystals, folk wisdom, and cycles of nature, and is overall a gentle parody of New Age pagans.

Despite appearances, beneath her silver jewelry and heavy eye makeup, Magrat is surprisingly practical. She can defend herself physically when necessary, and is capable of performing impressive feats of real magic (as seen in Wyrd Sisters when Magrat uses her magic to turn the old wooden door into a rising oak—a display that impresses even Granny Weatherwax). Magrat's gentle personality allows her to serve as a mediator between the often-clashing Granny Weatherwax and Nanny Ogg, but she does occasionally display a strong temper herself. In Witches Abroad Magrat was chosen to serve as a Fairy Godmother, but her inability to master the use of the wand (which had a tendency to reset to "pumpkins") prevented her from taking full advantage of the powers associated with this position. Magrat is technically a better doctor than the other two witches, since she actually believes in herbalism while Granny tends to use whatever plant or bottle of coloured water comes to hand as a prop for her headology (in this case the placebo effect), as explained in Lords and Ladies.

After a long engagement, Magrat became Queen of Lancre by marrying King Verence II. As of Carpe Jugulum the couple has one daughter, Princess Esmerelda Margaret Note Spelling. This unusual name was the result of Magrat's attempt to correct a mistake made by her own mother, who had intended for Magrat to be named "Margaret" but was unable to spell the name properly when she wrote it down for the priest. In an effort to ensure the proper naming of her child, Magrat appended "Note Spelling" in the note she passed to the priest. This back-fired when he read out the complete sentence, and was mortified afterwards, but the deed had been done and no attempt to change it could be made.

Magrat renounces witchcraft shortly before her marriage, partially to prepare for her duties as queen, but mostly out of frustration with the way she is treated by the senior members of the Lancre coven, and is supplanted by Agnes Nitt after the events of Maskerade. Her absence from Maskerade seemed to confirm that Magrat had retired from her career as a witch, but after Princess Esmerelda's birth she was forced to assume the Mother role in the coven when Granny Weatherwax decided to temporarily step down during the events of Carpe Jugulum. Nanny was none too pleased with this development, as Magrat being the Mother forced Nanny "to be the... Other One". Despite her new (temporary) role, at the end of the novel, she was asked, and acquiesced, to make tea by Granny Weatherwax, a role usually performed by the Maiden (in this case, Agnes Nitt).

Magrat makes a brief appearance in I Shall Wear Midnight, alongside her husband Verence as guest to the wedding of Roland de Chumsfanleigh (the new Baron of the Chalk) and Letitia Keepsake (the daughter and only child of the Duchess and late Duke of Keepsake), and was flown down from Lancre by Granny Weatherwax and Nanny Ogg. In The Shepherd's Crown, she is one of the people across the Disc who feels Granny Weatherwax's death when she dies of old age; she and Verence were attending a conference in Genua at the time. It is also revealed that since the events of Carpe Jugulum Magrat and Verence have had two more children.

In the Wyrd Sisters animated adaptation, Magrat is voiced by Jane Horrocks. In the BBC Radio 4 adaptation, she was played by Deborah Berlin.

A fossil species of Mesozoic ginkgo has been named Ginkgoites garlickianus after Magrat Garlick.

==== Agnes Nitt ====
Agnes Nitt, daughter of Threepenny Nitt, first appears in Lords and Ladies as one of the local Lancre girls led by Lucy "Diamanda" Tockley who decided to become witches during the absence of the Coven in Genua. Along with Violet "Magenta" Frottidge and "Amanita" DeVice, Agnes had adopted a more witchy-sounding name "Perdita". Faced with a disapproving Granny Weatherwax and Nanny Ogg, she reverted to her birth name when she approached them to learn true witchcraft after Diamanda's duel with Granny. Although she plays a very minor role in this book, Agnes is the only one of the 'cool' new witches other than Diamanda in whom Nanny Ogg senses any real Talent. Following Magrat's marriage to King Verence II, the role of Maiden in the Lancre coven was reluctantly taken up by Agnes. Agnes is a sensible young woman who suffers from a self-induced multiple personality disorder. Tired of being seen as just another overweight girl with "a nice personality and good hair", Agnes tried to create a new, more exciting persona for herself. Agnes calls this alter ego Perdita X Dream (where the X stands for: "a person who has a cool and exciting middle name"). Perdita is even more romantic than Magrat, although her tastes are more Gothic than New Age.

The Perdita persona leaves Agnes in two minds about everything. The first mind is herself, good-natured and sensible Agnes; the second is dramatic and rebellious Perdita. It is said that inside every fat girl, there is a thin girl waiting to get out (and a lot of chocolate)—according to Perdita, she is that girl. The Perdita personality usually manifests itself only as part of Agnes's internal dialogue, often in the form of sarcastic remarks (as though her 'Second Thoughts' have taken on a life of their own). Yet Perdita is capable of taking real action in emergency situations.

This divided personality makes Agnes highly resistant to mental manipulation. Anyone trying to mesmerise or entrance Agnes will find the Perdita personality surfacing as Agnes begins to lose control, and vice versa. When Lancre is overrun by vampires with mind-control powers in Carpe Jugulum, Agnes/Perdita is one of the few people capable of resisting their hypnotic influence.

In Maskerade Agnes becomes a major character for the first time. She leaves Lancre to become an opera singer in Ankh-Morpork, under the stage name 'Perdita X Nitt'. Agnes possesses a talent for singing. She has a vocal range that extends from a bass rumble to a glass-shattering soprano, can sing in harmony with herself, project her voice around a room, and mimic the voices of others. These abilities are due to her suppressed magical ability, which Agnes unconsciously uses to enhance her innate musical talent.

After joining the opera company, Agnes meets a beautiful but airheaded young singer named Christine (an obvious parody of Christine Daaé in The Phantom of the Opera). Although Agnes is by far the more talented of the two, she finds herself relegated to the chorus while Christine's career benefits from the attention of the mysterious "Opera Ghost". Agnes is also alienated from the rest of the chorus, due to her weight and practical nature. Granny and Nanny, having identified Agnes as the best candidate for the third member of the Lancre coven, soon arrive and complicate things further. In the end, Agnes realizes that her practical nature is unsuited the world of opera. She returns to Lancre and becomes the new Third Witch.

In Carpe Jugulum, the arrangement of the coven had been upset by Granny Weatherwax's sudden departure, although Agnes retained her role of Maiden. She, Nanny Ogg and Magrat Garlick fended off the clan of vampires, the de Magpyr, who threatened to take over Lancre, whilst at the same time fending off the rather forward romantic advances of the vampire clan's son, Vlad de Magpyr, who is fascinated with Agnes' dual mind, as it makes mind control over her difficult to impossible.

Agnes makes a brief appearance in The Sea and Little Fishes, where her voice is complimented during the Lancre Witch Trials by Mistress Clarity Shimmy: "That's a good cursin' voice she's got there. You know you've been cursed with a voice like that." She is also called by Nanny to help her take Granny home when Letice Earwig accuses Granny about her good behavior. At Granny's cottage, Agnes voices her own dislike of Letice Earwig before leaving with Nanny.

Agnes does not appear in A Hat Full of Sky, Wintersmith and I Shall Wear Midnight, stories which feature both Granny Weatherwax and Nanny Ogg, nor does she show up in The Wee Free Men, in which Granny Weatherwax and Nanny Ogg had a cameo. This leads to some speculation as to what had become of the coven. Her role in Wintersmith seems to have been filled in by Miss Tick, as more than three Witches together at one time becomes an "argument". She does, however, appear in The Shepherd's Crown, where she (along with Perdita) is one of the people across the Disc who feels Granny Weatherwax's death when she dies of old age; and then later attends Granny Weatherwax's Wake. It's revealed that Agnes has been going on singing tours, and had been in Quirm at the time of Granny's death.

=== Other Ramtops witches ===
==== Gwinifer "Old Mother" Blackcap ====
Witch stationed in Sidling Without and who is good with pigs, as acknowledged by Esme Weatherwax. She is mentor to Petulia Gristle, good with animals, and is apparently a pig-borer, cow-shouter and all-round veterinary witch. (The terms "pig-borer" and "cow-shouter" are plays on horse whisperer. According to The Discworld Almanak, pig-boring is a humane form of slaughter in which the animal is talked to death.)

==== Gammer Beavis ====
A witch who teaches school over the mountain from Lancre. She takes snuff and does her own shoe repairs, which makes her "All Right" in Nanny Ogg's book, but has a nasty habit of being reasonable when provoked. Appears in Witches Abroad and the short story "The Sea and Little Fishes".

==== Beryl "Old Mother" Dismass ====
A very old witch who has been fortune telling for so long that she is no longer able to keep her mind in the present (as Granny Weatherwax puts it, she has a "detached retina in her second sight"). Her mouth frequently appears out of sync with her words, and her footsteps often sound ten minutes before she actually makes them. Passing references to Old Mother Dismass are made in Maskerade and Wintersmith. Appears in Witches Abroad and "The Sea and Little Fishes" (where her given name is revealed as "Beryl").

==== Mrs Letice Earwig ====
The wife of a retired wizard and a natural organiser, especially of things that don't really need organising. She (and no one else) pronounces her name "Ah-wij" (a possible reference to Hyacinth Bucket from the BBC series Keeping Up Appearances). She wears a great deal of "occult" jewellery that doesn't actually do anything. Granny Weatherwax dislikes Mrs. Earwig, claiming that she reduces witchcraft to "shoppin'". Mrs Earwig isn't actually bad, but is extremely snobbish and self-absorbed (which is later revealed to make her immune to an Elf's power of glamour), has very poor people skills, and tends to assume everyone would really agree with her if they weren't so stupid (so does Granny Weatherwax, of course, but at least she doesn't blame them for being stupid).

Her approach to teaching appears to be to 'trust in the folk wisdom' of the locals when it comes to practical things like birthing and medicine, and focus on such things as crystals, magic circles and soothing chants to help matters along. Annagramma Hawkin is her star (and in fact only) pupil. She is also the (self-appointed) chairwoman of the Witch Trials committee and has written a book about "Magick"; the "k" is to distinguish what she considers the True Craft from the everyday stuff Granny Weatherwax and other witches do—this in turn is a comedic reference on Pratchett's part to the use of ostentatious variant spellings of the word "magic" (ranging from Aleister Crowley's to some Wiccans'). She also appears in "The Sea and Little Fishes", A Hat Full of Sky and Wintersmith.

According to The Shepherd's Crown, she has since taken on a new pupil after Annagramma, continuing-on her flawed approach to witchcraft. When she learns of Granny Weatherwax's passing, rather than feeling any grief, her first thoughts are to attaining Granny's 'first among equals' status (not yet knowing that Granny had already named Tiffany Aching as her successor), and about what she could now do with Granny's cottage to make it over anew. After having been thwarted during Granny's wake, she next attempts to 'convince' Tiffany that Tiffany needs her as an 'advisor' (viewing Nanny Ogg as unqualified), and is furious when Tiffany turns her away, and over the following weeks and months she fans rumours that Tiffany isn't up to the job (as Tiffany is stretched thin trying to witch two steadings). However, when the threat of the elves rises, she is amongst those called upon to fight them off (during which her 'immunity' to the elves glamour comes to light), and is amongst the force to drive the Elf Lords' Lankin's and Peaseblossom's forces away from Lancre.

==== Ammeline 'Goodie' Hamstring ====
Ammeline Hamstring, also known as 'Goodie' Hamstring, was a witch from Lancre, the Ramtops. She appeared only in Mort, and was Mort's first "collection" as Death's apprentice. She had a grey cat.

As with all Discworld magical practitioners, she knew in advance when her death would be and again would be personally visited by Death (or had a right to be anyway) so she had time to prepare.

When Mort arrived she was an elderly lady with a hooked nose wearing a grey woollen dress. After Mort cut the line connecting her soul to her body, she realised it was no longer bound by the body's morphic field, and with much more control than most people her soul's form settled into the shape of her "inner self". Her hair unwound itself from its tight bun, changing colour and lengthening, her body straightened up. Wrinkles dwindled and vanished, and her dress turned into something green and clingy.

Rather than go on to an afterlife, she remained at her home, intending her spirit to get thinner and spread through the forest.

==== Miss Level ====
A witch for whom the phrase "I've only got one pair of hands" was highly inappropriate, for she had one mind and two bodies. She formerly worked in a circus reading her own mind. The phrase is now only technically accurate, following the death of one body, although she can still use the other as a "phantom limb" of sorts. This has resulted in her gaining a huge amount of respect among the local population, who had previously always suspected she was two people. An intelligent and well-meaning person, she spends much of her time explaining concepts such as bacteria to people who aren't going to believe her. Granny Weatherwax arranges for her to be Tiffany's first teacher because (as Granny Weatherwax will only admit under duress), Miss Level is the best of Ramtops witches when it comes to tending to the sick and elderly, and waiting upon the ungrateful, which Granny considers the soul and center of witchcraft. As Tiffany's teacher, she appears in A Hat Full of Sky.

==== Miss Tick ====
Perspicacia Tick is a "Witch Finder", a travelling witch with the responsibility of finding young girls who have the potential to be witches. She makes a living as a teacher, a role which has given her a habit of correcting spelling, grammar and punctuation. Since she often finds herself in areas where witches are unwelcome, she has a spring-operated hat that only grows a point when she wants it to, although her name still provides a fairly obvious clue as to her real profession ("Miss Tick" = "Mystic").

Thanks to her time as a student at the Quirm College for Young Ladies, which views time in hot water as character-building, she has also mastered the ability to stay underwater for prolonged periods, allowing her to escape punishment from superstitious witch-hunters. To aid her in this endeavor, she is the anonymous author of Magavenatio Obtusis (Witch-hunting for Dumb People), which she generously places in the libraries of various witch-hating villages. It includes such vital information as drowning rather than burning a witch, ensuring that the witch has silver coins in her boots, and is given a nice meal of hot soup and tea before her ducking.

Miss Tick appears in The Wee Free Men, A Hat Full of Sky and Wintersmith (where it's revealed that Lucy Warbeck is learning from her to be a Witch Finder, and practices on her own while Miss Tick is out on the road).

In The Shepherd's Crown, she is asked by Tiffany to help find her a couple of potential young witches looking to learn the craft to help her caretake for two steadings, after which time, Tiffany is also approached by Geoffrey Swivel.

==== Diamanda Tockley ====
Her real name is Lucy Tockley, but she thought Diamanda was more witchy. She was born in Lancre, but went away to school, and returned while the Coven were touring the Disc in Witches Abroad. She set up her own coven, insisting that the Wisdom of the Ancients was more significant than anything a lot of old people knew. How much natural witchiness/wisdom she actually had may be illustrated by her willingness to summon sadistic elves. At the end of Lords and Ladies, Granny speculated she might have a relationship with the young wizard Ponder Stibbons, but he returned to Unseen University. Still to be decided is how much of a witch she naturally was versus how much magic was given to her by the elf queen.

Diamanda duelled Granny Weatherwax in Lords and Ladies. The challenge was to look directly at the sun for as long as they could stand. Nanny Ogg realized that Granny would lose the duel, so she enticed her grandson, Pewsey Ogg, to run across the magic circle in which the duel was taking place. Crossing the circle caused Pewsey to cry out. Granny looked away from the sun, got up and returned Pewsey to his grandmother. While Diamanda was the technical winner of the duel, the crowd considered Granny the best witch, because witches are supposed to help young boys who cry instead of being selfish. It is as yet unknown what happened to her following the events of Lords and Ladies.

==== Eumenides Treason ====
An "old bat" who takes on Tiffany Aching as apprentice three months prior to the events of Wintersmith. Many have come to the position before Tiffany, and she is the only one to not run away. Miss Treason uses two sticks to walk and is both deaf and blind, but manages to get along by Borrowing the senses of those around her. Perhaps her "creepiest" use of this talent is making whatever apprentice she has at the moment her "mirror" before they go out. She will have the poor dear stand in front of her and borrow her sight so that she can see herself from the girl's perspective. The girls who have experienced this say that the creepiest part is the tingling at the back of the eyes, something that anyone whose senses are being Borrowed experiences.

All witches specialise in one field or another, and Miss Treason's speciality is Justice (in fact her name refers to the Eumenides of Greek myth, who came to represent Justice in the later myths). People come to her to settle disputes, and usually find it very difficult to lie to her. This is most likely all in their heads, as Ms. Treason has a reputation as being very scary and also very powerful. It is said by the villagers that great kings and princes had come for miles just to ask her for her advice and to seek justice from her, and that the names of everyone is woven into the cloth she weaves on her loom (her main source of income). Though the villagers fear her more than anything else, they also seem to hold great respect for her. Ms. Treason later explains to Tiffany that she knew that the villagers would never love her, and that the other option was to make them fear her: She decided they either had to fear her, or love her, so that she could hold some power over them, using what she calls 'Boffo' (see below).

One of the most notable things about Miss Treason's cottage is that everything in it is black, from the floor to the rafters. While Tiffany is her apprentice, she has to paint her cheeses with black-colored wax so that they'll fit in with the theme. Her cottage has all the hallmarks of a 'bad witch' (i.e. skulls, spider webs, etc.,); all these are fake, bought from Boffo's, a joke shop in Ankh-Morpork. Treason also uses the name "Boffo" to describe the unique power that these props give her: She describes "Boffo" as "the power of expectations;" the strength that one gains from behaving exactly as someone expects you to.

No witch actually has spiders' webs in her cottage or keeps skulls for any reason, but most simple folk expect witches to do so, and so Miss Treason obliges them; the better to ensure that when people come calling they don't see what is really there (a tired, blind 111-year-old woman), but what they expect (a venerable, terrifying 113-year-old witch). She also ensured that many of the rumours about her are kept current and circulating, to ensure the presence of "Boffo thinking" among her clients. One of the most prevalent rumours is that her heart had stopped many years ago and that the iron clock she carries at her waist is actually an external mechanical heart.

Miss Treason dies of old age during the events of Wintersmith, but as she, like all witches, knows the date and time of her death, she was able to enjoy her funeral ceremony the day before. On the day of her death she comes out of her house to find: many Feegles who couldn't miss out on the ceremony (or apparently keep their mouths shut about it), a grave dug by said-Feegles, and many hysterical villagers (who are primarily concerned with Ms. Treason solving their problems, which she does, even as she walks into the grave). Mindful of her image to the very end, Miss Treason used the presence of the locals to give them one last show (i.e. walking into the grave, stopping her clock with her thumbnail to imply her death).

Tiffany, later, half-jests that continued visits by people to her grave may turn her into a goddess figure. This later comes to pass as, when Tiffany returns to the cottage, she sees that the villagers have been leaving pleas for help written on bits of paper around Miss Treason's grave, in the hope that she can help them from the beyond. Her cottage (and her loom) was then passed down to Annagramma Hawkin, who, after a decidedly shaky start, has begun to fulfill her role properly, with assistance from Tiffany and the Boffo's catalogue. She uses a green mask and feet props to convince people that she turns into a hideous monster when angered.

==== Alison "Nana" Weatherwax ====
Alison Weatherwax (also known as "Nana Alison"), is Esme Weatherwax's late (maternal) grandmother, and, in life, a very powerful witch. Weatherwaxes have strong magic lines in their genes, as evidenced by a distant cousin also being a wizard and archchancellor of Unseen University. First mentioned in The Discworld Companion which says little about her except that her death has not been recorded.

Alison is later mentioned in Carpe Jugulum, in which the rumours that she has "gone to the bad" and "hobnobed with vampires" were proven to be unfounded. She had in fact killed the old vampire Count de Magpyr at one point by cutting off his head and driving a wooden stake through his heart. At that time, she was apparently older than her granddaughter was during the events of Carpe Jugulum. When the old Count rises again years later, he remembers her with affection and admiration. Not the same as Aliss Demurrage.

==== Goodie Whemper ====
Generally referred to as "Goodie Whemper maysherestinpeace". She trained Magrat in witchcraft. Unlike many other witches, she tested details of spells and performed various other experiments (such as determining how many twigs you can pull from a broomstick's tail before it crashes), leaving several shelves of notes, recipes, and instructions in the cottage when Magrat inherited it. Despite having extensively trained Magrat in midwifery, she never taught her about the events leading up to it. She also loved to watch plays.

==== Mistress Shimmy ====
Mistress Clarity Shimmy has only made an appearance in "The Sea and Little Fishes". According to Nanny Ogg's 'mental filing system', Clarity "lives over towards Cutshade with her old mum, takes snuff, [and is] good with animals". Nanny quite likes her "because she didn't see her very often". Mistress Shimmy and Nanny Ogg catch-up during the Lancre Witch Trials, where-in Clarity fills Nanny in on the fact that her old mother died and was buried the month before, and observing the Trials, compliments Agnes Nitt's "cursin' voice... You know you've been cursed with a voice like that". She also observes Granny Weatherwax's disconcerting behavior change, wearing pink and being nice, and asks Nanny Ogg about it and starts worrying.

==== Mistress Letty Parkin ====
Appears briefly in "The Sea and Little Fishes" as one of the Witches cowed by Letice Earwig during the Lancre Witch Trials. When everyone is unnerved by Granny Weatherwax's good moods and behave nervously, Letice accuses Granny of putting the 'fluence on everyone and insists she leaves. Nanny Ogg tries to get Mistress Parkin's (one of Letice crowd), actual opinion, but has to tell Letice to shut-up when she tries to do Mistress Parkin's talking (and thinking) for her instead.

== Younger witches ==
=== Tiffany Aching ===
A young witch (not yet 16 at the start of I Shall Wear Midnight), Tiffany hails from the Chalk, a region of Downland Rimward of the Ramtops. Her grandmother, Sarah Aching, was a shepherd, and by Ramtop standards was also a witch, although witchcraft was frowned upon on The Chalk, until Tiffany's arrival. Granny Aching was a friend of The Chalk Clan of Nac Mac Feegle (an army of tiny, blue, rowdy, drunken and vaguely Scottish ne'er-do-wells), who befriended Tiffany as the new "hag o' the hills". As Tiffany was their Kelda (Queen) for a short time, the Nac Mac Feegle see her as their responsibility, and there has not been a time in Tiffany's life since then when they have not (in)discreetly watched her.

=== Trainee "coven" ===
Though witches have no leader, Tiffany joined an informal "coven" of peer witches she gathers together for sabbats, of which Annagramma Hawkin acted as the self-appointed "boss" due to her having the tallest hat and the loudest voice. This coven was based in the Ramtops region and, it is assumed, no longer continued once the trainee witches received their own steadings.

==== Annagramma Hawkin ====
Annagramma Hawkin was introduced in A Hat Full of Sky and is a peer of Tiffany Aching, whom she initially disdains. Trained by Letice Earwig, she can be extremely snobbish and has strong opinions about what a witch should or should not be, much like her mentor. On her first meeting with Tiffany Aching, Annagramma told Tiffany that she thought Granny Weatherwax was an 'ignorant old woman' who bullied and tricked people into thinking she was powerful, which, in her opinion, was an outdated form of witchcraft. Influenced by Mrs Earwig, she believed that witches should adopt a more professional form of witchcraft by employing 'higher MagicK' and using such tools as sacred circles, written spells, and 'real wands'.

During the events of Wintersmith, Annagramma is assigned her own cottage, taking over from the late Miss Treason. Initially, she is unprepared for the real demands of being resident witch for a village; after Tiffany rounds up their peers, the other members of their makeshift coven, and they are each able to give Annagramma small crash courses in true witchcraft (medicine, etc.) over the winter.

During this time it is revealed that her arrogance may in part be an overreaction to a deep insecurity about dealing with situations she cannot control. She admits to Tiffany, under pressure, that, unlike what her behavior might let people think, her family is quite poor, even for Lancre standards, not even having their own cottage (living in a rented one), nor do they have their own pig. This gives another reason why having her own cottage is so important to her. She later assists Tiffany by temporarily dispelling the Wintersmith's physical form with a fireball and ordering her broomstick to carry Tiffany away before he could re-form himself.

After Tiffany and others from her peer group assist Annagramma, it turns out that she is good enough at the part of witchcraft that consists of being tall, confident, bossy, and giving people a good show to pick up the rest along the way. Granny Weatherwax had suggested that the cottage be taken over by Tiffany, due to the fact that she was too young and Annagramma would be accepted instead (had Granny suggested any other witch, Annagramma would not have gotten the cottage). She later says, upon learning that Tiffany had been helping Annagramma, that she would have expected nothing less, leading Tiffany to conclude that the whole affair had been a ploy to prove to other witches that Mrs. Earwig's kind of witchcraft didn't work.

She also makes an appearance in The Shepherd's Crown, as when the threat of the elves rises, she is amongst those called upon to fight them off, and is amongst the force to drive the Elf Lords' Lankin's and Peaseblossom's forces away from Lancre.

==== Petulia Gristle ====
Petulia is a young witch who was apprenticed to Goodie Gwinifer "Old Mother" Blackcap, who is good with pigs. She was part of the network of peers gathered by Annagramma Hawkin and a friend of Tiffany Aching's. Generally a kind soul who is thoughtful of others' feelings, she gained new strength at the end of A Hat Full of Sky when bullied too much by Annagramma, due to her tendency of saying "Um" a lot.

By the events of Wintersmith Petulia has gained considerable respect in the Ramtops for her abilities with animals, particularly pigs, which are said to rival those of Granny Weatherwax herself, although what Granny would say on the subject is open to debate. She has become known throughout Lancre as the "pig witch", a term meant in respect, considering that most families in the mountains own a pig. Petulia dislikes the way Annagramma refers to her as the 'pig witch', because she feels that there is "too much pig and not enough witch" in Annagramma's description. Despite her disagreements with Annagramma, when Tiffany asked she agreed to teach Annagramma a few useful tips on dealing with livestock.

Petulia does not appear in I Shall Wear Midnight, but she is mentioned briefly as being an expert "pig borer" (literally boring a pig to death as a humane alternative to more violent means of slaughter) and that she is engaged to be married.

==== Dimmity Hubbub ====
Dimmity is a young witch in apprenticed training, and a member of Anagramma's coven. She appears in A Hat Full of Sky, in which she sets fire to her own hat, and in Wintersmith, she makes a toothache cure explode. Her name is similar to that of Jill Murphy's character Mildred Hubble of The Worst Witch novels, although Pratchett says this was not intentional.

==== Lucy Warbeck ====
Lucy is a young witch in apprenticed training, and another member of Anagramma's coven. She uses the term "like" often. She first appears in Hat Full of Sky, then briefly in Wintersmith, where she is training hard to become a witch-finder. Tiffany Aching asks her to assist the badly out-of-her-depth Annagramma and she reluctantly agrees to help out. She wears a knife and fork in her hair, because witches believe in sorting out how odd they are early.

== Witches of the Chalk ==
In the penultimate Tiffany Aching book, I Shall Wear Midnight, Tiffany has left the Ramtops area and settled into her steading as the Witch of the Chalk. During the events of the book, she encountered two young women who display latent witch talent.

=== Sarah "Granny" Aching ===
Sarah "Granny" Aching (née Grizzel) was Tiffany Aching's grandmother, and very good friends with the Chalk Hill clan of the Nac Mac Feegle. To them she was the "hag-o'-the-hills" (that is, the "witch of the Chalk"). She died two-years before the events in The Wee Free Men occurs, and, this being the case, only appears in flashbacks. There is substantial evidence that she was a witch, although she never said she was one. The Chalk's late Kelda confirms that Granny Aching was one, identifying that Granny Aching had "First Sight" and "Second Thoughts", as does her granddaughter and successor, Tiffany. When Tiffany speaks of Granny Aching to other witches, they often comment that she has many of the qualities of a very skilled witch, and one worthy of much respect, as her influence was such that the people she took care of ended up mostly taking care of each other (a feat only the most skilled witches are able to accomplish). Even the formidable Granny Weatherwax commented that she would have liked to have met Granny Aching.

She could be described as "salt of the earth" as well as the magma that runs beneath it. She was very important in the minds of the people of the Chalk, to the point where they called the thunder "Granny Aching cussin'", the buzzards "Granny Aching's chickens", the fluffy little white clouds of summer "Granny Aching's little lambs" and said she cussed the sky blue. Although people laughed when they said these things, part of them was not joking. For every inhabitant of the Chalk, Granny Aching was the Chalk; its best shepherd, its wisest woman and its memory, to the point that even the Chalk's Feegles say of her that she "[told] the hills what they are, every day. She [held] them in her bones. She [held] 'em in her heart." Granny Aching was "as if the green downland had a soul that walked about in old boots and a smocking apron and smoked a foul pipe and dosed sheep with turpentine". She smoked Jolly Sailor tobacco, and had two sheepdogs, Thunder and Lightning.

In The Wee Free Men, one of the last things that Tiffany saw when she was "truly awake" was Granny Aching, dressed as an ornamental shepherdess. Tiffany also became aware of people leaving small tributes at Granny's general gravesite, leaving her to wonder if Granny Aching is slowly becoming an actual cultural deity on the Chalk.

She was said to have a ringing personality, never lost a sheep in her life, and was taciturn "unless something was worth saying". Her petname for Tiffany, her favorite grandchild, was "Jiggit" (which means "Twenty" in the old counting language of shepherds, as Tiffany was her twentieth grandchild).

=== Letitia de Chumsfanleigh (née Keepsake) ===
Letitia de Chumsfanleigh (née Keepsake) was first introduced in I Shall Wear Midnight, as Letitia Keepsake, the daughter of the late Lord Keepsake, was Baron Roland de Chumsfanleigh's fiancée, and later became his wife and the new baroness of the Chalk. Letitia was raised in her father's castle by her mother after his death, and most of the time is cowed by her mother's personality. In the events of the book, it was revealed that having become involved with Roland, she also became insecure about the former fledgling-romantic relationship that had occurred between Roland and Tiffany, so she mail-ordered a spellbook from Boffo's Emporium from down in Ankh-Morpork (which she kept hidden from her mother) and tried to hex Tiffany, but all she accomplishes is to bring Tiffany to the attentions of the Cunning Man earlier than she would have (following the events of Wintersmith).

It was then revealed that, having grown-up in a stone castle, Letitia has a talent for witchcraft, but is untrained, and for years, Letitia was under the impression that what witchcraft entails is what is actually 'Boffo thinking' and wizardry (until Tiffany set her straight). After the climax of the book, Letitia and Roland were married by Tiffany in an ancient marriage ceremony by fire, before they were 'officially' wed the next day by an Omnian priest. Since she is the Chalk's new baroness, she is unlikely to pursue witchcraft as a profession but may instead take up spellcasting as a hobby.

=== Amber Petty ===
Amber is a girl who has suffered from domestic abuse at the hands of her father. After learning that she has fallen pregnant to a young man who has pursued a profession as a seamster, a profession he looks down upon in a man, her father beats her in a drunken rage, causing her to lose her baby. When this is discovered, she is left with the Nac Mac Feegle of the chalk for a time by Tiffany to undergo the 'soothing' by Jeannie, the Nac Mac Feegle kelda, who discovers that Amber has "the gift of understanding"; being able, for example, to intuitively understand the old language of the Feegle. As of the end of the events of I Shall Wear Midnight, she is married to her lover in a wedding presided over by Tiffany. She is currently being trained by the Chalk Kelda.

== Ankh Morpork witches ==
In I Shall Wear Midnight, Tiffany Aching travels to Ankh-Morpork and discovers a number of witches there. In the words of Mrs Proust, "Oh, there's a few of us, Doing our bit, helping people when we can."

=== Mrs. Proust ===
Mrs. Proust is the runner of the Boffo Joke Emporium. She naturally looks like the stereotypical "evil witch" of folk stories and appears to be the "lead" witch of the Ankh Morpork coven. She has one son who assists in the Joke emporium.

=== Miss Cambric ===
Better known as Long Tall Short Fat Sally, Miss Cambric is one of the witches who accompanies Mrs. Proust to the Chalk. She suffers from tides; her body expands and contracts with the moon's influence. She is being trained by Mrs. Happenstance. Her expanding and shrinking tendencies were very helpful in The Shepherd's Crown, where she was able to inflate and fall on fairies, thereby crushing them.

=== Mrs. Happenstance ===
Mrs. Happenstance also accompanies Mrs. Proust to the chalk. Little is known about her other than the fact that she has a small bladder and/or bowel troubles.

== Other witches ==
Other witches featured in the books include:

=== Aliss Demurrage ===
Aliss Demurrage, or Black Aliss as she was known (a nod to the name Black Annis, from English folklore, and her surname is a nod to the term 'Demiurge'), never appears in the books, being long dead, but she is a part of why Esme Weatherwax is the way she is. Aliss was an incredibly powerful Discworld witch. She knew all the tricks a witch should know, and had mastered the use of stories; Nanny Ogg said she could be running as many as three of them at once. Unfortunately, after a while she was unable to distinguish reality from her stories and started going mad—hence the name Black Aliss (although Granny Weatherwax and Nanny Ogg claim the name arose because she had black teeth and fingernails due to her love of sweets). She is the wicked witch mentioned in popular fairy tales such as Sleeping Beauty, and met her end when she was pushed into the oven of her gingerbread house (à la Hansel and Gretel). Black Aliss is the bad witch in most fairy tales.

Aliss trained Nanna Plumb, who trained Goody Heggety, who trained Nanny Gripes, who trained Granny Weatherwax. Esme is as powerful as Aliss was, if not more so, and is concerned constantly with keeping herself in check lest she end up like Aliss.

While Granny Weatherwax is said to be stronger than Black Aliss, Aliss is unconstrained by right and wrong. This apparently means she could, in addition to simply being evil, extend her own life as well as interfere with the nature of causality, such as preventing swords from cutting her. (Granny did the same in Maskerade, but instead shifted the wound forward in time, and causing it to wait several weeks before she would receive it, when it was more convenient for her.)

A gingerbread house appeared in The Light Fantastic, whose owner had been shoved into her own oven; however, this was a different witch (Goodie Whitlow) who met the same end due to narrative causality.

=== Hilta Goatfounder ===
A witch living in Ohulan Cutash (a town fifteen miles away from Bad Ass), who makes her money by selling medicine (says Granny), with names like Tiger Oil, Maiden's Prayer and Husband's Helper. She lives in Ohulan. While she cannot stand the "smoke and fug" of running a witch's tent in the market, she keeps her market stall dim, smoky, and with a dense herbal smell because her customers expect it (see Boffo). She was the one who persuaded Granny to fly on a broom and gave Granny her broom. She appears briefly in the book Equal Rites.

=== Erzulie Gogol ===
Mrs Gogol is a practitioner of voodoo living in Genua. After some initial confusion about whether being "foreign" means witchcraft is different, she assists the Lancre coven in getting rid of the Duc and getting Ella (who is hinted to be Mrs Gogol's daughter) into her rightful place on the throne. She has a black cockerel named Legba, which is able to frighten Nanny Ogg's tom Greebo. She resurrected Baron Saturday, Ella's father and a victim of Lilith de Tempscire's, as a zombie. She appears in Witches Abroad.

=== Brenda Loveknot ===
Known professionally as "the Evil Brenda", Mistress Loveknot is mentioned in the court transcript in The Illustrated Wee Free Men. She is a professional "evil witch", who was present at Princess Sandy of Brokenrock's christening, and cursed her to be stunned by a falling hamster on her eighteenth birthday. This was done by arrangement with the king, on the understanding that it would lead, inevitably, to marriage to a handsome prince. In the transcript, Mistress Loveknot's lawyer is at pains to point out that she is not, in fact, evil, merely fulfilling a necessary role.

== Fairy godmothers ==
Fairy godmothers are something of a cross between a witch and a wizard. A fairy godmother is a woman, likely always a witch to start with, who, probably through a bequest, acquires a magical responsibility over the life of a single individual. Like wizards, fairy godmothers use a magically imbued rod (in this case a wand, rather than a staff) to produce wizz-bang effects like turning pumpkins into coaches. However, fairy godmothering is probably another aspect of witchcraft, relying heavily on narrative causality.

=== Desiderata Hollow ===
A fairy godmother who appears in Witches Abroad, although she dies very early on. Her career meant she travelled a lot, although she was based in Lancre. She was friends with Magrat, since no-one else in the area liked foreign food, and bequeathed her wand to her so she would stop Lilith's stories. Even though she misspells most words in her letters (like Nanny Ogg) and is seen as unintelligent by other witches, she accurately predicts her death (just like the witch Agnes Nutter, from Good Omens) and tells Magrat not to let Granny and Nanny go with her because she knew that was the only way they would agree to go.

=== Nettle ===
A fairy godmother, mentioned in The Wee Free Men and named in the court transcript in The Illustrated Wee Free Men. She gave Princess Sandy the traditional gifts of health, wealth and happiness, only to be sued by the princess when she didn't feel very happy. Nettle solved this problem by turning the princess into a mirror and her lawyer into a toad.

=== Lily Weatherwax ===
The sister of Granny Weatherwax, featured in Witches Abroad. When Esme was still a child, Lily left Lancre following rows with her family—and possibly some sort of scandal—and changed her name to Lady Lilith de Tempscire (fr. temps cire, "weather wax"). She became a fairy godmother and "turned to the bad"; Granny seems more offended by the fact that Lily was convinced she was the "good one". It is implied that Granny was supposed to be the bad one but made herself good to balance things out. She became heavily involved with narrative magic and using mirrors to boost her power, eventually becoming the power behind the throne of Genua. She looks very much like Esme, only younger (she is actually older). She failed to "find herself" at the end of Witches Abroad after being imprisoned in a dimension of mirrors, and has not been seen since.

== Male witches ==
There are those occupations, like that of blacksmith and beekeeping, that are so old and arcane as to be tinged with witchcraft, and by tradition, considered to have a touch of magic to them, and their practitioners are seen as witches (although male ones).

=== Geoffrey Swivel ===
Introduced in The Shepherd's Crown, Geoffrey Swivel is the third and youngest son and child of Lord and Lady Swivel (one of the lordships of the Shires). A well-educated young man and a pacifist, he is naturally dissatisfied with the hunting practices of his father, which he considers barbaric. After a confrontation with his father over this, Geoffrey leaves home and heads up into the mountains, following the wind up towards Lancre, intending to become a witch (after having seen one flying on a broomstick).

=== Mr. Brooks ===
In Lords and Ladies he is the beekeeper at Lancre Castle, and has a special understanding of the hives and their denizens.

== Other media ==
In the 1995 BBC Radio 4 adaptation of Wyrd Sisters the witches were played by:

- Granny Weatherwax – Sheila Hancock
- Nanny Ogg – Lynda Baron
- Magrat Garlick – Deborah Berlin

In the 1997 Cosgrove Hall Films animation of Wyrd Sisters the witches were voiced by:

- Granny Weatherwax – Annette Crosbie
- Nanny Ogg – June Whitfield
- Magrat Garlick – Jane Horrocks

In 2013, a board game named "The Witches", which was designed by Martin Wallace, was published by Treefrog games.

== See also ==
- Ankh-Morpork City Watch
- Granny women
- List of Discworld characters
- Unseen University
