= Wyrd Sisters (TV series) =

- Genre: Fantasy, comedy, animation
- Created by: Terry Pratchett; Jimmy Hibbert
- Directed by: Jean Flynn
- Starring: Jane Horrocks; June Whitfield; Annette Crosbie; Christopher Lee; Rob Rackstraw; Eleanor Bron; Les Dennis; Jimmy Hibbert
- Composers: Keith Hopwood; Phil Bush
- Country of origin: United Kingdom
- No. of episodes: 6

Production
- Running time: 140 min.
- Production company: Cosgrove Hall Films

Original release
- Network: Channel 4
- Release: 18 May – 22 June 1997

Related
- Soul Music; Terry Pratchett's Hogfather

Wyrd Sisters is a six-part animated television adaptation of the Terry Pratchett novel, produced by Cosgrove Hall Films, and first broadcast on 18 May 1997. It was the second film adaptation of an entire Discworld novel (following the Welcome to the Discworld short, which was based on a fragment of the 1991 novel Reaper Man, and the Soul Music series).

== Plot ==
Wyrd Sisters, the 6-episode television animated fantasy-comedy series closely follows the plot of the novel, which features three witches: Granny Weatherwax, Nanny Ogg, and the junior witch, Magrat Garlick.

King Verence I of Lancre is murdered by his cousin, Duke Felmet, and the King's crown and infant son are given by an escaping servant to the three witches. The witches hand the crown and the child to a troupe of traveling actors, acknowledging that destiny will eventually take its course and Tomjon will grow up to defeat Duke Felmet.

However, the kingdom is angry and doesn't want to wait 18 years so the witches move it forward in time. Meanwhile, the duke has decided to get a play written and performed that is favourable to him so he sends the court jester to Ankh-Morpork to recruit the same travelling (now stationary) company that Tomjon is in.

The only problem is that Tomjon does not want to be king.

== Cast and characters ==
=== Main ===
- Christopher Lee as Death
- Jane Horrocks as Magrat Garlick
- June Whitfield as Nanny Ogg
- Annette Crosbie as Granny Weatherwax
- Eleanor Bron as Duchess Felmet
- Les Dennis as The Fool (King Verence II) and Tomjon
- Andy Hockley
- David Holt
- Jimmy Hibbert as Verence I of Lancre
- Rob Rackstraw as Duke Felmet
- Melissa Sinden
- Taff Girdlestone

== Episodes ==
No.	Title	Directed by	Written by	Original release date
1	"Episode 1"	Jean Flynn; Assistant And; Animation Director: John Offord	Story by : Terry Pratchett; Screenplay by : Jimmy Hibbert	18 May 1997
2	"Episode 2"	Jean Flynn; Assistant And; Animation Director: John Offord	Story by : Terry Pratchett; Screenplay by : Jimmy Hibbert	25 May 1997
3	"Episode 3"	Jean Flynn; Assistant And; Animation Director: John Offord	Story by : Terry Pratchett; Screenplay by : Jimmy Hibbert	1 June 1997
4	"Episode 4"	Jean Flynn; Assistant And; Animation Director: John Offord	Story by : Terry Pratchett; Screenplay by : Jimmy Hibbert	8 June 1997
5	"Episode 5"	Jean Flynn; Assistant And; Animation Director: John Offord	Story by : Terry Pratchett; Screenplay by : Jimmy Hibbert	15 June 1997
6	"Episode 6"	Jean Flynn; Assistant And; Animation Director: John Offord	Story by : Terry Pratchett; Screenplay by : Jimmy Hibbert	22 June 1997

== Production ==
=== Development ===
The series is based on Terry Pratchett's book Wyrd Sisters in his novel series Discworld. The first episode was released on 18 May 1997, and further episodes were released weekly until the sixth and final one has aired on 22 June. Wyrd Sisters was also broadcast as a film that ran for two hours and 20 minutes.
