= Carpe Jugulum =

1998 Discworld novel by Terry Pratchett

- First edition
- Author: Terry Pratchett
- Cover artist: Josh Kirby
- Language: English
- Series: Discworld; 23rd novel – 6th Witches story
- Subject: Vampire novels, youth culture, multiplicity; Characters: Granny Weatherwax, Nanny Ogg, Agnes Nitt; Locations: Lancre Überwald
- Genre: Fantasy
- Publisher: Doubleday, London
- Publication date: 1998
- ISBN: 0-385-40992-3
- Preceded by: The Last Continent
- Followed by: The Fifth Elephant

Carpe Jugulum (/ˈkɑːrpi ˈdʒʌɡjʊləm/; Latatian for "go for the throat", cf. Carpe diem) is a comic fantasy novel by English writer Terry Pratchett, the twenty-third in the Discworld series. It was first published in 1998.

In Carpe Jugulum, Terry Pratchett pastiches the traditions of vampire literature, playing with the mythic archetypes and featuring a tongue-in-cheek reversal of 'vampyre' subculture with young vampires who wear bright clothes, drink wine, and stay up until noon.

== Plot summary ==
Count Magpyr and family, vampires from Überwald, are invited to the naming of Magrat and King Verence's daughter, to be conducted by the Omnian priest, the Quite Reverend Mightily-Praiseworthy-Are-Ye-Who-Exalteth-Om 'Mightily' Oats, a recent graduate from theological college. During the party after the ceremony, Verence tells Nanny Ogg and Agnes Nitt that the Count has informed him that the Magpyr family intend to move into Lancre Castle and take over. Due to a type of hypnotism, everyone seems to consider this plan to be perfectly acceptable. Only the youngest witch, Agnes, and Mightily Oats seem able to resist the vampiric mind control, due to their being "in two minds about everything" (resulting from her Perdita persona, and his contemplation of the tenets of the myriad schismatic sects of Omnianism). Because of her ability to resist his influence, the Magpyr son, Vlad, is attracted to Agnes and makes many advances on her including trying to convince her to become a vampire. Meanwhile, the castle falconer Hodgesaargh goes out searching for a phoenix after discovering a phoenix feather.

Meanwhile, Granny Weatherwax, feeling slighted by not receiving an invitation to the ceremony, has left her cottage empty and seems to be working towards a life in a cave, almost like a hermit. After they have left the hypnotic influence of the Vampires, Agnes, Nanny Ogg and Magrat attempt to convince her to help them save Lancre, but apparently without success, even after Granny is informed that her gilt-edged invitation was stolen by a magpie.

The three witches return to Lancre to take on the Count and his family without her, but because the Magpyr family have built up a tolerance for the normal methods of defeating a vampire, such as garlic, bright light, and religious symbols, this is not so easily done. Just when it seems all is lost, Granny Weatherwax comes through the front door, soaked to the bone and swaying with exhaustion. Nanny Ogg and Magrat use Granny's assault upon the Count as a distraction to escape, leaving Granny, Agnes and Brother Oats with the Vampires. Granny is unable to get through the Count's mental defences, and the Magpyrs feed on her, with the intention of transforming her into a vampire. Nanny attempts to organise resistance against the Magpyrs, rallying her extended family to form a mob, and promising the Nac Mac Feegle (a race of six-inch-high, blue-skinned militant fairy folk evicted from Überwald by the Magpyrs as an "outdated" race) an uninhabited island in exchange for an alliance against the Magpyrs.

Igor, the servant of the Magpyrs, is hated by the Magpyrs for his traditionalist "more gothic than thou" attitude, as Igor tries to keep the "tradithionalitht" ways alive often against the wishes of the modern current Count Magpyr, including forcing spiders to spin cobwebs. Igor has a pet dog named Scraps, made from the parts of several dogs.

Nanny Ogg, Magrat, and Magrat's infant daughter, Esmerelda Margaret Note Spelling of Lancre, escape with the help of the rebelling Igor (who appears to have a crush on Nanny), but are forced to detour to Überwald and end up in the Magpyrs' castle. Agnes is kidnapped by the Magpyrs' son and their clan, who give chase by flying. After being taken to the village of Escrow where the Magpyrs have established a means of feeding similar to tax-gathering, Agnes instigates a rebellion against the Vampires.

Granny Weatherwax struggles against the vampirism inside her and thrusts the pain this causes into the iron of the castle forge's anvil. She is only able to defeat the vampirism after she looks inside herself and faces the darker side of her nature, but the struggle leaves her barely able to stand, let alone defeat the Count. Granny also surmises that there was a phoenix in the mews the entire times Hodgesaargh was out searching for one, having taken the shape of a hawk (having hatched amongst them).

While Magrat and her daughter hide in Igor's dungeon quarters, Nanny and Igor begin fighting against the Magpyrs, using the considerable stock of Holy water and other religious symbols that were originally collected by old Count Magpyr (who is described as having been "a sportsman"). Surprisingly (for the Magpyr family, at least), the old-fashioned ways to defeat vampires that they thought themselves protected against start to work again (with conditioning against religious symbols resulting in the recognition of such in any random pattern). They don't understand what the problem is, although they start to have bizarre cravings for "hot, sweet strong tea and biscuits", a combination that has them feeling quite upset (it not being their usual craving for blood).

All is revealed when Granny (who has "helped" Mightily Oats to Überwald by being carried by him), tells them that — far from turning her into a Vampire — they have, instead, been 'Weatherwaxed'; she had magically "Borrowed" her own blood, which they drank, allowing her past their mental defences. The Magpyrs find themselves unable to harm Magrat's daughter, or do anything else that Granny herself is unable to do (e.g. fly). They are even more horrified when they find out that Igor has re-awakened the old Count Magpyr (having gone into his crypt and spilled a drop of blood on the old Count's cremated ashes), and that the people of Überwald would prefer the old Count to their new, modern type of vampirism. Oats gives the new Count a mortal wound across the neck with an axe (though for vampires, mortal wounds aren't necessarily the end), and the old Count is left to teach the two young Magpyrs (Lacrimosa and Vlad) the "old ways." The three vampires are last seen turning into a flock of magpies and disappearing into the darkness of the castle roof. The novel ends with Nanny organising her relatives to attend a sermon by Oats, as he plans to travel to Überwald continue his missionary work; before he leaves, King Verence presents him with an axe-shaped pendant (replacing his Omnian turtle pendant which he lost earlier), and Agnes presents him with a poultice for his facial boil.

== Characters ==
- Granny Weatherwax
- Nanny Ogg
- Agnes Nitt
- Perdita Nitt
- Mightily Oats
- Magrat Garlick
- Verence II
- Esmerelda Margaret Note Spelling of Lancre
- Count de Magpyr
- Bela de Magpyr
- Vlad de Magpyr
- Lacrimosa de Magpyr
- Igor
- Death
- Death of Rats

== Analysis ==
Randall Munroe takes Granny Weatherwax's assertion that "sin [...] is when you treat people as things" as an alternative phrasing of Immanuel Kant's categorical imperative—in particular, the second formulation thereof. Adam Roberts likewise takes it as an encapsulation of Kantian ethics in general.

Reading order guide
Preceded by The Last Continent	23rd Discworld Novel	Succeeded by The Fifth Elephant
Preceded by Maskerade	6th Witches Story; Published in 1998	Succeeded by "The Sea and Little Fishes"
