= The Sea and Little Fishes =

- Short story by Terry Pratchett
- Language: English
- Genres: Fantasy clichés, Characters Granny Weatherwax, Nanny Ogg Locations Lancre

Publication
- Series: Discworld; 3rd short story – 7th Witches story

The Sea and Little Fishes is a short story by Terry Pratchett, written in 1998. It is set in his Discworld universe, and features Lancre witches Granny Weatherwax and Nanny Ogg. It was originally published in a sampler alongside a story called "The Wood Boy" by Raymond E. Feist, and later in a collection called Legends.

The story established a basis for various elements of the novel A Hat Full of Sky, but is not required to understand that novel.

== Plot ==
A coalition of witches, led by self-appointed organiser Lettice Earwig, asks Granny Weatherwax not to participate in the annual Lancre Witch Trials, on account of her always winning. She agrees, becoming disconcertingly nice.

=== Commentary ===
It is revealed in later stories, most specifically the Tiffany Aching series, that this is because Granny has made it clear that she does not approve of Lettice Earwig's methods, and admitting that a rival is correct "at the time of her own choosing" is the greatest and most calculated insult Granny can possibly deliver to another which, essentially having agreed with Lettice Earwig's own unwitting 'admission' that she cannot beat Granny.

The title has confused people; Pratchett has since explained that Granny is the sea, and the other witches are the fishes (at one point Nanny says that calling Granny 'full of pride' is like calling the sea 'full of water'; water is what the sea is).

It is based on the "ancient phrase" The big sea does not care which way the little fishes swim, which Pratchett made up at some point before the story, and finally used in Night Watch.

== Translations ==
- Rybki Małe Ze Wszystkich Mórz (Polish)
- "Η θάλασσα και τα ψαράκια", translated by Nikos Manousakis, Anubis 2006. (Greek)

Reading order guide
Preceded by Carpe Jugulum	7th Witches Story; Published in 1998	Succeeded by A Hat Full of Sky (Note: The witches appear as supporting characters in the Tiffany Aching stories starting with The Wee Free Men. A Hat Full of Sky further develops the Witch Trials and the character of Mrs. Earwig.)
