= Oh, No! Not THEM! =

- Directed by: David Mirkin
- Starring: Nigel Planer; Jackie Earle Haley; Robert Bundy; Shari Shattuck; Kristi Somers
- Country of origin: United States
- Original language: English

Production
- Producer: David Mirkin

Original release
- Release: October 29, 1989

Oh No Not Them is an untelevised 1989 television pilot commissioned by the Fox network. The pilot was an American remake of the British television show The Young Ones. It was directed and produced by David Mirkin, starred Nigel Planer, Jackie Earle Haley and Robert Bundy and featured an animated opening credit sequence set to music by Danny Elfman that Planer compared in his autobiography to the title sequence of The Simpsons. Fox did not pick up the series and the pilot was never broadcast.

== Premise ==
The pilot revolves around Neil being mugged by a man dressed up as a grandma. Scared that the mugger will arrive at their house to rob and kill them, housemates Neil, Rip and Todd, arm themselves with guns, only to turn on one another. Rip declares the downstairs Ripland and protects himself with a nuclear bomb, which accidentally detonates. Miraculously, everyone survives and, having learned their lesson, rid the house of weapons just as the mugger arrives.

== Characters ==
- Nigel Planer as Neil
- Jackie Earle Haley as Rip
- Robert Bundy as Todd

== Production ==
Nigel Planer was the only member of The Young Ones cast to have any involvement with the US remake, being brought in to reprise his role of Neil.

Robert Llewellyn, who played Kryten in Red Dwarf and was the only member of the British cast to take part in a US pilot of the show, compared his experience to Nigel Planer’s, writing in his book The Man in the Rubber Mask (1994):

The Young Ones was taken over the Atlantic in the mid eighties, and Nigel [Planer] was the only member of the British cast to go. He had experienced a fairly hideous time, worried sick that he was going to have to stay there for six years with a group of people he hated who managed to make The Young Ones into a sort of grubby Benny Hill Show. He was hugely relieved when the pilot was a flop and he was released from his contract.

In Planer's 2025 memoir Young Once, he recalls that a lot of material from the original was replicated, alongside sequences involving a gunfight between the characters. He also reveals that he has remained good friends with Bundy.

== Availability ==
In November 2025, Planer announced that he had digitized his personal VHS copy of the pilot, and would be releasing it onto his Patreon page in support of Young Once, with viewers being charged £10 to access the file.

== Reception ==
In a December 2025 article on The Anorak Zone ranking all twelve episodes of The Young Ones, "Oh, No! Not THEM!" was included in the list in the number thirteen position. Describing the setting as "mainly just Nigel Planer carrying two neutered, directionless fellow student characters, "Rip" and "Todd", one of which is vaguely based on Vyvyan and the other just a stock character of no real discernable invention," and, further, that "a real problem with the two new characters is that they have no character motive other than waiting for Neil to make their dinner for them, and they don't sound dissimilar enough to be distinct." They describe the pilot as a whole as "lacking in pace and energy," and its attempts at meta-humour "passé." On the writing in the pilot, they say that "although most of the script by David Mirkin is original material [...] any elements taken from the original show are devoid of deeper meaning" and that the US pilot "comes over as something like Saved by the Bell." Ultimately concluding that "the script really makes you realise how special the original show was."
