= Lords and Ladies (novel) =

1992 Discworld novel by Terry Pratchett

- First edition
- Author: Terry Pratchett
- Cover artist: Josh Kirby
- Language: English
- Series: Discworld; 14th novel – 4th witches story
- Subject: Shakespeare, Crop circles, Fairy lore
- Genre: Fantasy
- Publisher: Victor Gollancz Ltd
- Publication date: 1992
- ISBN: 0575052236
- Preceded by: Small Gods
- Followed by: Men at Arms

Lords and Ladies is a fantasy novel by British writer Terry Pratchett, the fourteenth Discworld book. It was originally published in 1992. Some parts of the storyline spoof elements of Shakespeare's play A Midsummer Night's Dream.

== Synopsis ==
Granny Weatherwax, Nanny Ogg, and Magrat Garlick return to Lancre after their recent adventure in Genua. Magrat is stunned when King Verence proclaims their imminent marriage, having already made all the arrangements in her absence. The sudden appearance of crop circles reveals to Nanny and Granny that it is now "circle time", a convergence of parallel universes when the Discworld is susceptible to incursions from the "parasite universe" of the Elves. Elves are capricious and amoral creatures that enter the minds of animals and sentient beings in a more destructive way than witches do, using "glamour" to alter human's perceptions of them. They are normally kept away by a circle of magnetized iron standing stones known as the Dancers. When Nanny and Granny refuse to explain the situation to Magrat, she leaves the coven, disavows witchcraft, and moves into an apartment in Lancre Castle. She soon becomes bored with the courtly lifestyle and unsure of her place.

Mustrum Ridcully, Archchancellor of Unseen University, leads a small group of faculty to attend the wedding. Along the way, they are joined by the Dwarfish lothario Casanunda.

Granny and Nanny discover that a group of local girls, led by Diamanda Tockley and including Agnes Nitt, have formed a new coven whose activities include dancing naked at the Dancers. The two elderly witches try to convince them to stop, with Granny ultimately besting Diamanda in a public witchcraft contest and discrediting the new coven. But a defiant Diamanda later runs through the Dancers into the land of the Elves, where she is knocked unconscious by a poisoned Elven arrow before being rescued by Granny. Nanny subdues an Elf that pursues them back into Lancre, using an iron fireplace poker; Elves and their powers are severely weakened by iron. The witches bring Diamanda and the Elf to Lancre Castle, where Magrat treats Diamanda and Verence agrees to imprison the Elf (though Magrat inadvertently frees it later). Meanwhile, Granny has begun to experience memories of other paths her life has taken in parallel worlds, as well as a growing sense of her own impending death.

Jason Ogg and the other Lancre Morris Men plan a play to be performed for the wedding guests. When they rehearse near the Dancers, the Elves influence them to include Elvish elements in the play. As a result, when the play is performed at the Dancers, it causes sufficient belief—a powerful force on the Discworld—that the Elves are able to make the guests dismantle the stone circle. The Elves arrive, and the Elf Queen plans to legitimize her rule of Lancre by marrying Verence. None of the members of the Lancre coven are present at this time: Magrat has locked herself in her room due to perceived insults in a letter she has discovered, written by Granny to Verence, advising him to plan the wedding; Nanny is being romanced by Casanunda; and Granny has been magically whisked away by Ridcully, who hopes to resume a romantic connection they had when much younger. The women only become aware of what has happened once the Elves begin to wreak havoc in Lancre. Aided only by general dogsbody Shawn Ogg, Magrat fights her way through the infiltrated castle. She discovers a portrait of Queen Ynci, one of the kingdom's legendary founders. Suddenly inspired by the idea of becoming a warrior queen, Magrat finds and dons Ynci's armour. Feeling influenced by Ynci's spirit (and unaware that Ynci is a fiction, the armour constructed from cookware only a few generations previously), she rescues a captured Shawn and sets out for the Dancers. While Granny and Ridcully make their way through the woods, resulting in Granny's capture by the Elves, Nanny and Casanunda travel through a gateway to the abode of the Elf King, who opposes the Elf Queen despite being her spouse.

At the Dancers, Magrat arrives to confront the Elf Queen at the same time as the people of Lancre, rallied by Shawn and Nanny. But the Elf Queen quickly subdues Magrat with glamour. The captive Granny mentally combats the Elf Queen and releases Magrat from the glamour before succumbing to the Elf Queen's attack, her prone body being covered by the bees from her hive, which have swarmed at the Dancers. When the Elf Queen turns her powers on Magrat, attempting to stop her resistance by dismantling her identity, she exposes the unexpectedly valorous core of Magrat's being – something which Granny had deliberately been stoking, aggravating and provoking all along for just this very outcome. Magrat attacks and subdues the Elf Queen just in time for a projection of the Elf King to arrive and send the Elves back to their world.

Granny appears to be dead, but then Nanny and Magrat learn that she has actually borrowed her bees' hive mind, a feat thought impossible. They break open a window in the castle, where Ridcully has reverently laid Granny's body, enabling the bees to get close enough for her to regain consciousness. Nanny points out to Magrat that Granny's letter to Verence has had a great positive impact on Magrat's life, as well as giving her the strength to fight the Elf Queen. Magrat and Verence are married by Ridcully. Later, Granny and Ridcully make peace with their past and their place in the universe. The growing sense of impending death she had been feeling had been due to the impending deaths of some of her parallel-selves.

== Characters ==
- Granny Weatherwax
- Queen of the Elves
- Mustrum Ridcully
- Nanny Ogg
- Magrat Garlick
- King Verence II
- Shawn Ogg
- Ponder Stibbons

== Reception ==
In 1995, Kirkus Reviews considered the novel "a so-so addition to a mostly hilarious series", but praised the "agreeably wry, self-deprecating quality" of the humour. In 2000, Publishers Weekly found it "uneven", noting that "[o]nly in the last third of the novel does [Pratchett] strike a successful balance among action, imagination, and comedy", and that the fun only begins "once the smiling, sadistic elves actually appear", ultimately concluding that the novel is "unlikely to widen [Pratchett's] readership".

Reading order guide
Preceded by Small Gods	14th Discworld Novel	Succeeded by Men at Arms
Preceded by Witches Abroad	4th Witches Story; Published in 1992	Succeeded by Maskerade
