= Maskerade =

1995 Discworld novel by Terry Pratchett

- First edition
- Author: Terry Pratchett
- Cover artist: Josh Kirby
- Language: English
- Series: Discworld; 18th novel – 5th witches story
- Subject: Opera, The Phantom of the Opera; Characters: Granny Weatherwax, Nanny Ogg, Agnes Nitt; Locations: Ankh-Morpork
- Genre: Fantasy
- Publisher: Victor Gollancz Ltd
- Publication date: 1995
- ISBN: 0-575-05808-0
- Preceded by: Interesting Times
- Followed by: Feet of Clay

Maskerade is a fantasy novel by British writer Terry Pratchett, the eighteenth book in the Discworld series. The witches Granny Weatherwax and Nanny Ogg visit the Ankh-Morpork Opera House to find Agnes Nitt, a girl from Lancre, and get caught up in a story similar to The Phantom of the Opera.

== Plot summary ==
Agnes Nitt leaves Lancre to seek a career at the Opera House in Ankh-Morpork, which has recently been purchased by Seldom Bucket, formerly a cheesemonger. When Granny Weatherwax realizes Nanny Ogg has written an immensely popular "cookbook" but has not been paid by the publisher (and that the nom de plume of 'A Lancre Witch' may lead people to believe that she rather than Nanny wrote it), the witches leave for Ankh-Morpork to collect the money. They also hope to recruit Agnes into their coven, to replace Magrat Garlick who left the coven when she became Queen of Lancre (in Lords and Ladies). This has the side benefit of distracting Granny from becoming obsessive and self-centred, or so Nanny believes to her great relief. En route, they meet Henry Slugg, an Ankh-Morporkian opera singer who adopted a Brindisian persona of Enrico Basilica to further his career but yearns for Ankh-Morporkian cuisine after years of Brindisian pasta, squid and tomato sauce; and Granny makes a deal with Death for him not to claim the fatally-ill son of an innkeeper.

Agnes Nitt is chosen as a member of the chorus, where she meets Christine, a more popular but less talented girl whose father lent Bucket large sums of money to purchase the Opera House. The Opera Ghost, who has long haunted the opera house without much incident, begins to commit seemingly random murders staged as "accidents", and also requests that Christine be given lead roles in several upcoming productions. Due to her incredibly powerful, versatile and possibly magical voice, Agnes is asked to sing the parts from the background, unbeknownst to Christine or the audience. After swapping rooms with Christine, Agnes begins receiving late-night training from the Opera Ghost originally intended for Christine.

Having discovered the problems at the Opera House and also having coerced the publisher to pay Nanny richly for her book, the witches investigate the mystery, with Granny posing as a rich patron (using Nanny's royalties), Nanny insinuating herself into the opera house staff, and Nanny's cat Greebo being transmogrified into human form (as during Witches Abroad) to pose as Granny's companion. Agnes unmasks Walter Plinge, the janitor, as the ghost, though as he is seemingly harmless, the others are unconvinced. Andre, another employee, is suspected, but he turns out to be a Cable Street Particular. Granny determines that the finances of the Opera House, which are a complete mess, have been made so intentionally in order to hide the fact that money is being stolen, with the murders being used either as a distraction or to cover up the evidence.

It is finally revealed that two people had been masquerading as the ghost. The original (and harmless) ghost, Walter Plinge, was being psychologically manipulated and blackmailed by the second ghost, Mr Salzella (Director of Music at the Opera House), who assumed the identity to commit the murders and theft, and frame Walter if he ever came close to being caught. With the witches' help, Walter is able to overcome his fears and help defeat Salzella, who is killed by believing that the fencing staged in opera is actual lethal swordplay, dying despite not actually being injured, although not before delivering a lengthy monologue about his hatred of opera. Walter then goes on to become the new Director of Music, integrating his own music into the opera, turning them into musicals. Slugg, decidedly abandoning his Enrico Basilica persona after being assaulted and concussed by Salzella, reunites with Angeline Lawsy, his childhood sweetheart, and is introduced to his long-lost son Henry Lawsy. Agnes, after realising that she does not fit in with the environment of the opera, returns to Lancre to learn how to be a witch from Granny and to serve as the third member of the Lancre Coven.

== Characters ==
- Agnes Nitt (Perdita)
- Christine, a parody of Christine Daae
- Walter Plinge, a parody of Michael Crawford
- Mrs. Plinge
- Salzella
- Seldom Bucket
- Dr. Undershaft
- The Opera Ghost
- Henry Slugg (Enrico Basilica)
- Nanny Ogg
- Greebo
- Granny Weatherwax
- André
- The Librarian
- Death
- The Death Of Rats

== Adaptations ==
A stage adaptation by Hana Burešová and Štěpán Otčenášek (partly using adaptation by Stephen Briggs) premiered in Divadlo v Dlouhé, Prague in April 2006. Pratchett attended the closing performance five years later.

== Reception ==
BuzzFeed listed Maskerade as the 11th-best Discworld novel, noting that "it works well as a parody of the tropes of opera, and as a murder mystery".

== Reviews ==
- Envoyer (German) (Issue 3 - Jan 1997)

Reading order guide
Preceded by Interesting Times	18th Discworld Novel	Succeeded by Feet of Clay
Preceded by Lords and Ladies	5th Witches Story; Published in 1995	Succeeded by Carpe Jugulum
