= Equal Rites =

1987 Discworld novel by Terry Pratchett

- First edition
- Author: Terry Pratchett
- Cover artist: Josh Kirby
- Language: English
- Series: Discworld; 3rd novel – 1st Witches story
- Subject: Fantasy clichés, Feminism; Characters: Eskarina Smith, Granny Weatherwax; Locations: Ankh-Morpork, Lancre
- Genre: Fantasy
- Publisher: Victor Gollancz Ltd in association with Colin Smythe
- Publication date: 15 January 1987
- ISBN: 0-575-03950-7
- Preceded by: The Light Fantastic
- Followed by: Mort

Equal Rites is a comic fantasy novel by Terry Pratchett. Published in 1987, it is the third novel in the Discworld series and the first in which the main character is not Rincewind. The title is a play on words related to the phrase "Equal Rights".

The novel introduces the character of Granny Weatherwax, who reappears in several later Discworld novels. The protagonist Eskarina Smith does not return until I Shall Wear Midnight, which was published 23 years later.

Pratchett based the character Esk on his daughter Rhianna Pratchett.

== Plot summary ==
The wizard Drum Billet knows that he will soon die and travels to a place where an eighth son of an eighth son is about to be born. This signifies that the child is destined to become a wizard; on the Discworld, the number eight has many of the magical properties that are sometimes ascribed to seven in other mythologies. Billet wants to pass his wizard's staff on to his successor.

However, the newborn child is actually a girl, Esk (full name Eskarina Smith). Since Billet notices his mistake too late, the staff passes on to her. As Esk grows up, it becomes apparent that she has uncontrollable powers, and the local witch Granny Weatherwax decides to travel with her to Unseen University in Ankh-Morpork to help her gain the knowledge required to properly manage her powers.

But a female wizard is something completely unheard of on the Discworld. Esk is unsuccessful in her first, direct, attempt to gain entry to the University, but Granny Weatherwax finds another way in; as a servant. While there, Esk witnesses the progress of an apprentice wizard named Simon, whom she had met earlier, on her way to Ankh-Morpork. Simon is a natural talent who invents a whole new way of looking at the universe that reduces it to component numbers.

Simon's magic causes a hole to be opened into the Dungeon Dimensions while he is in Esk's presence. The staff, acting to protect Esk, strikes Simon on the head, closing the hole but trapping his mind in the Dungeon Dimensions. Esk throws the staff away, believing that it attacked Simon. While attempting to rescue him, Esk ends up in the Dungeon Dimensions. The extreme cold there causes the staff, now washed out to sea, to create a huge ice sheet, causing a storm that floods the university as well as the surrounding city.

Esk and Simon discover the weakness of the creatures from the Dungeon Dimensions—if you can use magic, but don't, they become scared and weakened. With the help of Granny Weatherwax and Archchancellor Cutangle, who have retrieved the staff, they both manage to transport themselves back into the Discworld. Esk and Simon go on to develop a new kind of magic, based on the notion that the greatest power is the ability not to use all the others.

== Characters ==
- Granny Weatherwax
- Eskarina Smith
- Simon
- Drum Billet, dying wizard, bloody-minded apple tree and reincarnated ant
- Archchancellor Cutangle

== Reception ==
Dave Langford reviewed Equal Rites for White Dwarf #87, and called it "screwy and dotty" and concluded that the book was "Good fun."

Wendy Graham reviewed Equal Rites for Adventurer magazine and stated that "This time the lates in the Discworld's 'n-ology' deals and debunks one of the classic cliches – why are witches women, warlocks and wizards men? Why can't a woman be a Wizard? Why shouldn't Eskarina be admitted to the Unseen University?"

J. Michael Caparula reviewed Equal Rites in Space Gamer/Fantasy Gamer No. 85. Caparula commented that "While not a terribly original concept, it comes alive here amidst the fanciful farce and is treated with a sense of wonder. A think-while-you-laugh treat."

== Reviews ==
- Review by Pauline Morgan (1987) in Fantasy Review, January-February 1987
- Review by Barbara Davies (1987) in Vector 137
- Review by Faren Miller (1987) in Locus, #315 April 1987
- Review by David Langford (1987) in Foundation, #40 Summer 1987
- Review by Ken Brown (1987) in Interzone, #20 Summer 1987
- Review by Andy Sawyer (1988) in Paperback Inferno, #70
- Review by Greg Cox (1989) in The New York Review of Science Fiction, June 1989
- Review by Bruce Gillespie (1991) in SF Commentary, #69/70
- Review [French] by Marc Lemosquet (1995) in Yellow Submarine, #113

Reading order guide
Preceded by The Light Fantastic	3rd Discworld Novel	Succeeded by Mort
Preceded by None	1st Witches Story; Published in 1987	Succeeded by Wyrd Sisters
