= Small Gods =

1992 Discworld novel by Terry Pratchett

- First edition
- Author: Terry Pratchett
- Cover artist: Josh Kirby
- Language: English
- Series: Discworld; 13th novel – 3rd individual story
- Subject: Religion, Philosophy; Characters: Brutha, Om; Locations: Omnia, Ephebe
- Genre: Fantasy
- Publisher: Victor Gollancz
- Publication date: 1992
- ISBN: 0-06-017750-0
- Preceded by: Witches Abroad
- Followed by: Lords and Ladies

Small Gods is the thirteenth of Terry Pratchett's Discworld novels, published in 1992. It tells the origin of the god Om, and his relations with his prophet, the reformer Brutha. In the process, it satirises philosophy, religious institutions, people, and practices, and the role of religion in political life.

== Plot background ==
Omnia is a theocracy based on the Seven Books of the Prophets of Om, collectively known as the Septateuch. The Discworld is flat and is orbited by its sun, but Omnian doctrine says that the world is round and orbits the sun. Omnians believe in a single god, Om, though the Discworld has many gods, including the billions of Small Gods who exist as points of desire searching for believers. Om was once a Small God, but managed to speak to a shepherd, gained believers (despite the shepherd being stoned to death) and took over from Ur-Gilash as the God of what became Omnia. In Omnian tradition there is a new Prophet every two hundred years.

== Plot ==
The Great God Om tries to manifest himself once more in the world, as the time of his Eighth Prophet is nigh. He finds himself in the body of a tortoise, stripped of his divine powers except for the ability to singe eyebrows with tiny thunderbolts. In the gardens of Omnia's capital of Kom, he addresses the novice Brutha, the only one able to hear his voice. Om has a hard time convincing the boy of his godliness as Brutha is convinced that Om can do anything he wants and would not want to appear as a tortoise.

Brutha is gifted with an eidetic memory and is therefore chosen by Vorbis, the head of the Quisition, to accompany him on a diplomatic mission to Ephebe as his secretary. Despite his amazing memory, Brutha is illiterate and rarely thinks for himself. This begins to change after Brutha discovers Ephebe's philosophers; the idea of people entertaining ideas they are not certain they believe or even understand is an entirely new concept to him.

With the help of Ephebe's Great Library and the philosophers Didactylos and his nephew Urn, Om learns that Brutha is his only genuine believer. All others either just fear the Quisition's wrath or go along with the church out of habit. After learning that Vorbis had facilitated the death of the missionary Brother Murduck to cover up his being mocked by Ephebian citizenry and to provide a reason for war against Ephebe, Brutha uses his memory to reluctantly aid an Omnian raid through the Labyrinth guarding the Tyrant's palace. Because of his authorship of De Chelonian Mobile (The Turtle Moves), which contradicts Omnian dogma about the shape of the Discworld, Didactylos is brought before Vorbis to face reprisal. Seemingly conceding his previous views about the shape of the world and willing to write a retraction extolling Omnian interpretations, Didactylos escapes after hitting Vorbis with his lantern. Ordered by Vorbis to burn down the Library, Brutha memorizes many scrolls in order to protect Ephebian knowledge as Didactylos sets fire to the building to stop Vorbis reading its scrolls. Completely unrelated to the story, the Librarian of the Unseen University travels through L-Space to rescue several of the abandoned scrolls.

Fleeing the ensuing struggle in Urn's steam-powered boat, which is destroyed as the price for an earlier deal made between Om and the Sea Queen, Brutha and Om end up washed up on the desert coast. Trekking home to Omnia with a catatonic Vorbis, they encounter ruined temples dedicated to long-dead, long-forgotten gods, the faint ghost-like small gods yearning to be believed in to become powerful, the small-god-worshipping anchorite St Ungulant, and the human cost of Vorbis's plan of leaving caches of water in the desert to attack Ephebe. Realising his 'mortality' and how important his believers are to him, Om begins to care about them for the first time.

While Brutha, Vorbis, and Om are in the desert, the Tyrant of Ephebe manages to regain control of the city and contacts other nations who have been troubled by Omnia's imperialistic ambitions. Sergeant Simony, whose native Istanzia had been conquered by Omnia in his youth, brings Didactylos and Urn to Omnia to lead the Turtle Movement in a rebellion against the Church.

On the desert's edge, a recovered Vorbis attempts to finish off Om's tortoise form, knocks out and abducts Brutha, and proclaims himself as the Eighth Prophet, elevating Brutha to archbishop to buy his silence. After Urn accidentally activates the hydraulic system which secretly operates the doors of the Great Temple, Brutha interrupts Vorbis's ordainment. As a result, Brutha is to be publicly burned for heresy but Om comes to the rescue, dropping from an eagle's claws onto Vorbis' head, killing him. The great crowd witnesses this miracle and comes to believe in Om, making him powerful again. In the ethereal desert, Vorbis learns to his horror that what he thought was the voice of Om was in fact his own voice echoing inside of his own head, plunging him into despair and leaving him unable to cross the desert and face judgement.

Om manifests himself over the citadel and attempts to grant Brutha the honour of establishing the Church's new doctrines. However, Brutha wishes to establish a 'constitutional religion' whereby Om Himself obeys Omnianism's new commandments and answers some of the prayers of his followers in exchange for a steady source of belief, believing that Om will lose his power again otherwise.

Ephebe has allied with several other nations along the Klatchian coast and has sent an army against Omnia, establishing a beachhead near the citadel. Brutha attempts to establish diplomatic contact with the generals of the opposing army, wishing to stop the war before it starts by surrendering. Despite trusting Brutha, the leaders state they do not trust Omnia and that bloodshed is necessary. At the same time, Simony leads the Omnian military including Urn's 'Iron Turtle' war engine to the beachhead in order to fight the anti-Omnian alliance.

Om attempts to physically intervene in the battle, but Brutha demands he does not interfere with the actions of humans. Om is infuriated but obeys Brutha, and instead travels to Dunmanifestin, where gods gamble on the lives of humans in order to gain or lose belief. Om unleashes his fury on the other gods, causing a storm that disrupts the battle. Eventually he compels all other gods of the forces at the battle to tell their soldiers to stop fighting and make peace.

In the aftermath Brutha becomes the Eighth Prophet, ending the Quisition's practice of torture and reforming the church to be more open-minded and humanist, with the citadel becoming home to the largest non-magical library on the Discworld. Om also agrees to forsake the smiting of Omnian citizens for at least a hundred years. A hundred years to the day after Om's return to power Brutha dies. In the afterlife he finds the spirit of Vorbis and, taking pity on him, guides him to his judgement. It is revealed that this century of peace was originally meant to be a century of war and bloodshed which the History Monk Lu-Tze changed to something he liked better.

== Characters ==
- Brutha, a novice in the Omnian Temple. He is apparently 17, which is old for a novice. He cannot read or write but has perfect recall of anything he sees or hears. He can quote chapter and verse from Omnian Scripture. He can also estimate time and distance accurately. Om speaks to him by sending his voice directly into Brutha's brain.
- Vorbis, the Exquisitor in charge of the Omnian Quisition. He wants to be the Eighth Prophet of Om. The Great God Om cannot speak to Vorbis, whose mind seems like a hard steel ball.
- Om, a Discworld God occupying the body of a tortoise. Om had been out on the astral plane and attempted to assume the shape of a bull three years ago, but instead turned into a tortoise. He remained non-sentient in this form until being picked up by an eagle and dropped into the citadel, fortunately landing on a compost heap instead of rocks. Om depends on Brutha to exist and possibly regain power, dreading the fate of gods who become nothing more than disembodied voices on the wind when they run out of believers. Besides Brutha, Om can talk to other gods, such as the Sea Queen, with whom he has to bargain for Brutha's life after Vorbis causes a porpoise to be killed. Unlike other gods, Om begins to see humans as important, if only to keep up the number of believers. He also realizes that he needs prophets to talk to people on his behalf.
- Didactylos, a blind Ephebian philosopher who lives in a barrel and carries a lantern. He keeps the Library of Ephebe, full of philosophical scrolls that are written but almost never read. His basic philosophy is "We are here, it is now, anything else is guesswork."
- Urn, Didactylos's technically-minded nephew whose knowledge of steam power leads him to build a steam-powered boat and an Iron Turtle, a steam-powered war engine intended to aid the Turtle Movement. Steam powered machines contradict Omnian dogma, which states that such devices cannot perform work as they have neither minds nor muscles.
- Sergeant Simony, a soldier in the Omnian army who wants to kill Vorbis himself out of revenge for the Omnian annexation of his home country, Istanzia. He is an avowed misotheist, albeit only towards Om.
- Lu Tze, one of the Monks of History, who decides to improve Omnian history so it is less bloody. He spends time working in the gardens of the Omnian Temple observing Brutha while sweeping and keeping the soil beds. He may have arranged the compost heap for Om to fall on, thus allowing him to survive.
- Cut-Me-Own-Hand-Off Dhblah, a "convenience food" merchant working in the Place of Lamentation, the public square by the Temple. He is known for "live yoghurt" that threatens to climb out of its container. He is the Omnian equivalent of the Ankh-Morporkian 'merchant venturer' Cut-Me-Own-Throat Dibbler.
- St. Ungulant, born Servian Thaddeus Ungulant, a hermit who lives in the desert and communes with the small gods, who serve him imaginary feasts. He actually survives by eating bugs and drinking water from certain plants, which enables Brutha and Vorbis to survive. He has an imaginary friend, Angus, who is real enough to kill a lion that attacks him, and is therefore another small god.
- Brother Nhumrod, Master of the Novices. When Brutha comes to him asking about hearing the voice of Om, he lectures Brutha about demonic voices, on which he is an expert, hearing them constantly himself.
- Death, who appears to several Omnians and conducts them to the edge of the great starlit black desert, which they must cross to face Judgement. All do so willingly except Vorbis, who cowers there until Brutha comes to lead him.
- The Gods of Discworld, who exist because people believe in them. Since they only need belief, they are otherwise callous and unintelligent. The Sea Queen demands lives in payment for the killing of a porpoise, despite Om telling her that the humans with him don't deserve to die. However, she is easily distracted by a ship full of Omnians in pursuit, killing all but Vorbis. The gods also take the form people believe, so the Ephebian goddess of wisdom, Patina, has a penguin as a companion instead of an owl, because of a sculptor's mistake that people started to believe. Om tells Brutha that all the various gods of natural forces are really the same ones using different disguises and props. In Dunmanifestin, Om encounters Blind Io, the Thunder God and chief of the Discworld gods, whom he strikes, and P'tang P'tang, a giant newt worshiped by a nation of fifty-one marsh-dwelling nomads.

== Reception ==
Australian author Jack Heath described the book as "one of the 20th century's finest satires", and added that "the gods are pompous, the worshippers cowed, and the priests violently closed-minded. Yet the tale is never heavy-handed, thanks to Brutha's sincerity and some deftly comical plot twists, as well as all the levity that comes from picturing an angry God trapped in the body of a tortoise." T.M. Wagner praised it as "an extraordinary novel" on SFreviews.net, and called it a "biting but compassionate satire". In 2011, National Public Radio ranked it #57 on its list of 100 best science fiction / fantasy novels.

Pratchett stated that he received fan mail from "(1) pagans who say that it really shafts the Big Beard in the Sky religions, and (2) Christians who say that it is an incredibly pro-Christian book".

== Adaptations ==
In 2006 the book was adapted as a serial for BBC Radio 4. It starred Patrick Barlow as Om, Carl Prekopp as Brutha, and Alex Jennings as Vorbis. Anton Lesser was the narrator.

A stage version of Small Gods was adapted in 2010 and performed between 17 and 19 February 2011 at The Assembly Rooms Theatre, Durham by OOOOK! Productions and members of Durham Student Theatre. All profits were donated to The Orangutan Foundation. The adaptation was written by Ben Saunders, a graduate of the University of Durham department of Archaeology.

In January 2016 the official Terry Pratchett Twitter feed announced an upcoming comic adaptation of Small Gods by cartoonist Ray Friesen.

An audiobook read by Andy Serkis was released on Audible on the 28th of April 2022; Bill Nighy and Peter Serafinowicz also had small roles.

Reading order guide
Preceded by Witches Abroad	13th Discworld Novel	Succeeded by Lords and Ladies
Preceded by "Troll Bridge"	4th Individual Story; Published in 1990	Succeeded by The Truth
