= Granny Weatherwax =

Character in Terry Pratchett's Discworld novels

Esmerelda Weatherwax
- Discworld character
- Illustration by Paul Kidby
- First appearance: Equal Rites (1987)
- Last appearance: The Shepherd's Crown (2015)
- Created by: Terry Pratchett
- Voiced by: Annette Crosbie; Sheila Hancock

In-universe information
- Occupation: Witch
- Affiliation: Nanny Ogg; Magrat Garlick; Agnes Nitt; Tiffany Aching; Eskarina Smith
- Home: Lancre

Esmerelda "Esme" Weatherwax (also Granny Weatherwax or Mistress Weatherwax) is a fictional character from Terry Pratchett's Discworld series. She is a witch and member of the Lancre coven. She is the self-appointed guardian of her small country, and frequently defends it against supernatural powers. She is one of the Discworld series's main protagonists, having major roles in seven novels.

She is a very powerful witch, and is reckoned to be more powerful than the most well-known witch on the Discworld, Black Aliss. Granny says in Lords and Ladies that she "learned my craft from Nanny Gripes, who learned it from Goody Heggety, who got it from Nanna Plumb, who was taught it by Black Aliss". The witches of the Lancre coven reflect the roles of Maiden, Mother, and Crone, with Granny, being most associated with the Crone — tactfully referred to as "the other one" — though meeting the criterion for the Maiden too.

Due to her prowess, Granny Weatherwax is first among equals of the Ramtops witches: "Witches are not by nature gregarious, at least with other witches, and they certainly don't have leaders. Granny Weatherwax was the most highly-regarded of the leaders they didn't have." In Wyrd Sisters, the ghost of the King of Lancre addresses her as "Doyenne of Witches" ("Senior Lady of Witches"). Granny Weatherwax's reputation extends to other species: the Trolls of the Ramtops call her "Aaoograha hoa" ("She Who Must Be Avoided"; mentioned in Maskerade), the Dwarf call her "K'ez'rek d'b'duz" ("Go Around the Other Side of the Mountain"; also mentioned in Maskerade), and the Nac Mac Feegle call her "The Hag O' Hags" ("The High Witch").

== Family and background ==
According to Witches Abroad, Esmerelda "Esme" (later "Granny") Weatherwax is the younger of two daughters. Her father was a hunter who taught her that "a bad hunter chases, a good hunter waits" (Lords and Ladies). Little is revealed about her mother except that she had a long illness and Esme nursed her until her death.

Magical ability runs in the Weatherwax family; a distant cousin, the wizard Galder Weatherwax, is Archchancellor of Unseen University at the time of The Light Fantastic. When Esme was a child, her older sister Lily began misusing magic and behaving in a "wanton" and "wilful" manner. Lily left home as a teenager and never returned to Lancre.

By the time Esme reached her teens, she was determined to become a witch. She occasionally struggles with temptation to become a "wicked witch", but also feels obligated to be "the good one" to balance her sister. In Lords and Ladies she reveals that she was not chosen as an apprentice by an established witch, but "camped on old Nanny Gripes' garden until she promised to tell me everything she knew. Hah. That took her a week and I had the afternoons free... No I chose..."). As a young woman, Esme was involved in a summer-long romance with student wizard Mustrum Ridcully, but ultimately they were both committed to their respective paths of witchcraft and wizardry. She was also acquainted with Gytha Ogg, who is about the same age, although their friendship does not develop until they are older. Esme eventually became the witch for village of Bad Ass and the Kingdom of Lancre as a whole.

Granny, as she comes to be known, is in her 70s or 80s during the events of Wyrd Sisters, Witches Abroad, Lords and Ladies, Maskerade and Carpe Jugulum. She dies quietly at home at the beginning of the final Discworld novel, The Shepherd's Crown. Her death is mourned by Ridcully, who has loved her since his student days. When Death comes for her, he tells her that her candle will continue to flicker long after she dies and that she has left the world in a better condition than it was when she entered it. Author Neil Gaiman, a friend of Pratchett's, has said that Pratchett died before writing a scene he had intended for the ending of The Shepherd's Crown. According to Gaiman, this would have revealed that Granny's spirit had lingered to watch over her young successor Tiffany Aching, and that when she did finally depart with Death it was on her own terms.

== Appearance ==
Granny Weatherwax has striking blue eyes and a penetrating gaze, a hooked nose, and a determined set to her jaw. In Equal Rites she is described as "handsome", having an excellent complexion, no warts, and all her teeth, although it is implied she finds this a bit inappropriate for a witch. Granny is thin, mentioning in Lords and Ladies that she weighs 9 stone (130 lb), and is described as being taller than Nanny Ogg and Magrat.

She typically wears a plain black dress, a somewhat battered black cloak (occasionally lined with dark red) and a tall, pointed witch's hat, skewered to her "iron-hard grey bun" hairstyle with multiple hatpins. Her broom is a hand-me-down from another witch, Hilta (Equal Rites), and has been repaired many times. Due to its age, it requires the user to pick up speed by running along the ground before taking off.

== Personality ==
Granny Weatherwax has a near unshakeable, and usually accurate, belief in her own abilities. She believes in doing what is right rather than what is easy or even what seems "nice"; she is quietly aware of her social weaknesses and easily leans into the stereotype of an imposing, frightening witch if it suits her purposes. Granny appreciates practicality and hard work, and distrusts fiction and theater (up to and including many books) because of their powerful influence on people's minds and ability to openly mislead them.

The journal Gender Forum has posited that Granny Weatherwax bears some similarity to Sam Vimes and Death. All three are effectively 'good' characters who exert a rigid control over the darkness inside themselves, which they secretly fear but (crucially to their characters) are able to conquer.

According to The Pratchett Portfolio Granny's typical saying is: "I can't be having with that kind of thing".

== Powers ==
Granny is adept at 'Borrowing', the art of overlaying her mind on the mind of another creature so that she can see through its eyes and steer its actions. She can sense the moods of plants, animals, and even places such as the Kingdom of Lancre and Unseen University. While Borrowing, her body falls into a deathlike trance. It is revealed in Lords And Ladies that in order to prevent embarrassing accidents, she has taken to wearing a placard reading "I ATE'NT DEAD" when she does so. When her body finally dies, she edits this placard to state "I IS PROBLY DEAD", with 'ATE'NT' scratched out.

Although capable of powerful magic, Granny Weatherwax prefers to avoid using it. She often relies on headology, a sort of folk-psychology that makes use of the placebo and nocebo effects. For instance, although Granny is capable of placing curses upon people who anger her, she will instead simply allow them to believe that she has cursed them. This causes the "cursed" person to worry and attribute any misfortune they experience to the "curse". Nanny Ogg has implied that this avoidance of magic specifically prevents Granny from being tempted into becoming a very successful "bad" witch, who seemingly tend to meet with embarrassing, ignoble ends. In The Sea and Little Fishes, Nanny Ogg attributes Granny's magical abilities more to hard work than innate talent.

Because of her reluctance to openly use magic, Granny Weatherwax is sometimes accused by others of "working by trickery alone", and of "having little or no real power". Yet when the need arises, Granny Weatherwax has demonstrated skills such as psychokinesis (Lords and Ladies) and pyrokinesis (The Sea and Little Fishes). In Wyrd Sisters she sends the entire nation of Lancre forward in time fifteen years to allow the lost heir to come of age. Much like wizards in the same setting, she also warns about the extreme use of magic potentially attracting unwanted supernatural attention.

== Bibliography ==
Granny Weatherwax is one of Terry Pratchett's most prolific recurring characters. She is a major character in six Discworld novels (Equal Rites, Wyrd Sisters, Witches Abroad, Lords and Ladies, Maskerade and Carpe Jugulum) and the short story The Sea and Little Fishes, and a supporting character in the five Tiffany Aching books (Wee Free Men, A Hat Full of Sky, Wintersmith, I Shall Wear Midnight, and The Shepherd's Crown). She is referred to in three other Discworld novels, Mort, Thief of Time, and Going Postal, and appears in The Science of Discworld II: The Globe.

A. S. Byatt considered that Granny "became more and more complex" as she appeared in more novels, while National Public Radio considered her an "iconic" character and "one of [Pratchett]'s clear favorites".

In the Wyrd Sisters animated adaptation, Granny Weatherwax was voiced by Annette Crosbie and in the BBC Radio 4 dramatisation she was played by Sheila Hancock.

== Reception and legacy ==
A fossil species of Mesozoic ginkgo has been named Ginkgoites weatherwaxiae in Granny Weatherwax's honour.
