= Witches Abroad =

1991 Discworld novel by Terry Pratchett

- First edition
- Author: Terry Pratchett
- Cover artist: Josh Kirby
- Language: English
- Series: Discworld; 12th novel – 3rd witches story
- Subject: Fairy tales, voodoo and tourism; Characters: Granny Weatherwax, Nanny Ogg, Magrat Garlick; Locations: Genua, The Road from Lancre to Genua
- Genre: Fantasy
- Publisher: Victor Gollancz
- Publication date: 1991
- ISBN: 0-575-04980-4
- Preceded by: Reaper Man
- Followed by: Small Gods

Witches Abroad is the twelfth Discworld novel by Terry Pratchett, originally published in 1991.

== Plot ==
Following the death of the witch Desiderata Hollow, Magrat Garlick receives Desiderata's magic wand, for Desiderata was not only a witch but also a fairy godmother. By giving the wand to Magrat, she effectively makes Magrat the new fairy godmother to a young woman called Emberella, who lives across the Disc in Genua. Unfortunately, Desiderata does not give Magrat any instruction on how to use the wand, so almost everything that Magrat points it at simply becomes a pumpkin.

Desiderata has promised a servant girl (providing a twist on Cinderella) named Emberella that she will not be forced to marry the Duc, the figurehead leader of Genua, who is in actuality really a frog, transformed by the magic of Emberella's other fairy godmother, Lady Lilith de Tempscire. Now it is up to Magrat and her companions, Granny Weatherwax and Nanny Ogg, to ensure Emberella does not marry the Duc, despite the desires of Lilith, who wishes to ensure a 'happy ending' by using the Discworld's narrative-based nature - because the servant girl marrying the Prince makes for a happy fairy tale, Lilith reasons that on the Disc, this must hold true as well, whether the marriage is consensual or not.

The trio of witches journey to Genua, which takes some time and involves numerous mis-adventures, such as an encounter with a village terrorised by a Vampire (where Nanny Ogg's cat Greebo catches it in bat form and eats it), an incident where they encounter a Running of the Bulls-like event, and a house falling on Nanny's head which she survives thanks to her hat with the willow reinforcement. Upon arrival in Genua, Magrat goes to meet Emberella, while the two older witches meet Erzulie Gogol, a voodoo witch, and her zombie servant, Baron Saturday (who was also her late lover).

It is at this time that Magrat finds out that Emberella has two fairy godmothers, Magrat and Lilith. It was Lilith who has manipulated many of the various stories that the Witches have travelled through and who is now manipulating Genua itself, wrapping the city around her version of the Cinderella story. Lilith has had people arrested for crimes against stories, including the arrest of a toymaker for not being jolly, not whistling and not telling the children stories. At this point it is revealed that Lilith is actually Lily, Granny Weatherwax's older sister. The trio learn that she is planning a masked ball where-in Emberella is supposed to meet the Duc.

Using hypnosis, Granny persuades Magrat to attend the masked ball in place of Emberella. Greebo is transformed into human form to aid the witches. Emberella's dress fits, but the glass slippers do not. After enjoying themselves for a while at the ball, the witches are discovered and are cast into a dungeon.

At that point, Emberella, Mrs. Gogol and Baron Saturday arrive at the ball, having broken the witches out of their prison with the aid of Cassanunda (a dwarf and the Disc's second greatest lover). A high concentration of magic causes the Duc to revert to his frog form, and he is trampled by Baron Saturday, causing Lily to flee. Granny starts to follow, but Mrs. Gogol, wanting to kill Lily, tries to stop Granny by using a voodoo doll. Granny thrusts her arm into a flaming torch and preys upon Mrs. Gogol's own belief in the power of the doll to make it burst into flames. Granny Weatherwax then pursues Lily.

Emberella is informed that, as the daughter of the late Baron Saturday, the previous ruler of Genua, she is now Duchess of Genua. Her first command is to end the ball (she dislikes them) and attend the Mardi Gras parade, a form of binge-drinking carnival.

Granny manages to defeat Lily by faking her own death and breaking into Lily's mirror maze; however, when Granny breaking one of Lily's mirrors sets her magic out of balance, Lily is trapped in the mirror, unable to 'find herself', and the three witches return home. Granny shows Magrat how to use the wand to do magic, and that it takes more than wishing - the secret is that there are adjustable dials on the wand. Magrat throws the wand into a river, to be lost forever. Then the Witches go home, the long way, and see the elephant.

== See also ==
- The Frog Princess

Reading order guide
Preceded by Reaper Man	12th Discworld Novel	Succeeded by Small Gods
Preceded by Wyrd Sisters	3rd Witches Story; Published in 1991	Succeeded by Lords and Ladies
