= Wyrd Sisters =

1988 Discworld novel by Terry Pratchett

- First edition
- Author: Terry Pratchett
- Cover artist: Josh Kirby
- Language: English
- Series: Discworld; 6th novel – 2nd Witches story
- Subject: Shakespeare, especially Macbeth and Hamlet; Characters: Granny Weatherwax, Nanny Ogg, Magrat Garlick, Verence II; Locations: Lancre
- Genre: Fantasy
- Published: 10 November 1988 Victor Gollancz Ltd
- Awards: Came 135th in the Big Read
- ISBN: 0-575-04363-6
- Preceded by: Sourcery
- Followed by: Pyramids

Wyrd Sisters is Terry Pratchett's sixth Discworld novel, published in 1988. It re-introduces Granny Weatherwax of Equal Rites.

== Plot ==
Wyrd Sisters features three witches: Granny Weatherwax; Nanny Ogg, matriarch of a large tribe of Oggs and owner of the most evil cat in the world; and Magrat Garlick, the junior witch, who firmly believes in occult jewelry, covens, and bubbling cauldrons, much to the annoyance of the other two.

King Verence I of Lancre is murdered by his cousin, Duke Felmet, after his ambitious wife persuades him to do so. The King's crown and child are given by an escaping servant to the three witches. The witches hand the child to a troupe of travelling actors, and hide the crown in the props box. They acknowledge that destiny will eventually take its course and that the child, Tomjon, will grow up to defeat Duke Felmet and take his rightful place as king.

However, the kingdom is angry about the way the new King is mistreating the land and his subjects. The witches realise that it will be at least 15 years until Tomjon is able to return and save the kingdom, but by then irreparable damage will have been done. Granny Weatherwax, with help from the other two witches, manages to cast a spell over the entire kingdom to send it forward in time by 15 years. Meanwhile, the duke has decided to have a play written and performed that portrays him in a favourable light and the witches in a negative light. He thinks this will cause the witches to lose their power, and the people will like him. He sends the court Fool to Ankh-Morpork to recruit the same acting company that Tomjon was given to, which now resides in the Dysk Theatre on the river Ankh.

The company make their way to Lancre, and perform the play for the King as asked. However, Hwel, the playwright, maintains that there is something wrong with the plot of the play, something that just doesn't feel right. The witches cast a spell in the middle of the play that causes the actors to portray the killing of the king truthfully, and the audience sees that the Duke and Duchess are guilty of killing Verence I. Felmet finally succumbs to insanity and stabs several people with a retracting stage dagger, before tripping and falling to his death in the Lancre Gorge. The Duchess is imprisoned but manages to escape, only to be killed by a collection of various forest animals who want revenge for the poor treatment of the land.

Granny Weatherwax explains that Tomjon is the rightful king, and he is due to be crowned. However, Tomjon does not want to be king; he is an extremely talented actor and wishes to continue his career with his adoptive father, Vitoller. Instead Granny Weatherwax tells the town that the Fool is in fact the king's son from another mother, and Tomjon's half-brother, and he is crowned King Verence II of Lancre. Later on, Granny and Nanny reveal to Magrat that the previous fool is actually Tomjon's and Verence II's father. The status of Magrat and Verence II, who have been awkwardly courting throughout the story, is not fully explained at the conclusion.

== Characters ==
- Esme Weatherwax
- Nanny Ogg
- Magrat Garlick
- King Verence
- Leonal Felmet and Lady Felmet
- The Fool
- Tomjon Vitoller
- Olwyn Vitoller
- Hwel
- DEATH
- Actor 2

== Outside references ==
The text makes overt references to the Marx Brothers, The Tramp of Charlie Chaplin, and Laurel and Hardy, as well as the life and works of William Shakespeare. It borrows themes and sayings from Macbeth, including "when shall we three meet again", the "dagger of the mind", "out damned spot", the three witches, and the title of the novel itself; from Hamlet, including the ghost of the dead King and the play within a play; "all the world's a stage" from As You Like It; and Duke Felmet descending into madness in the company of his Fool, derived from King Lear. In addition, the company of actors includes a playwright by the name of "Hwel" or "Will", and, at Tomjon's instigation, the company is building a theatre called The Dysk in Ankh-Morpork, a reference to the Globe Theatre in London. Hwel wants to write plays that are more than just "stabbing and shouting". A speech he wrote merely to cover a scene change resembles the "Band of Brothers" speech from Henry V. Tomjon declaims it in The Mended Drum tavern, quieting a brawl in progress. Tomjon reads some of Hwel's rejected ideas, which echo pantomime dialogue, the musicals of Andrew Lloyd Webber, and Waiting for Godot.

== Adaptations ==
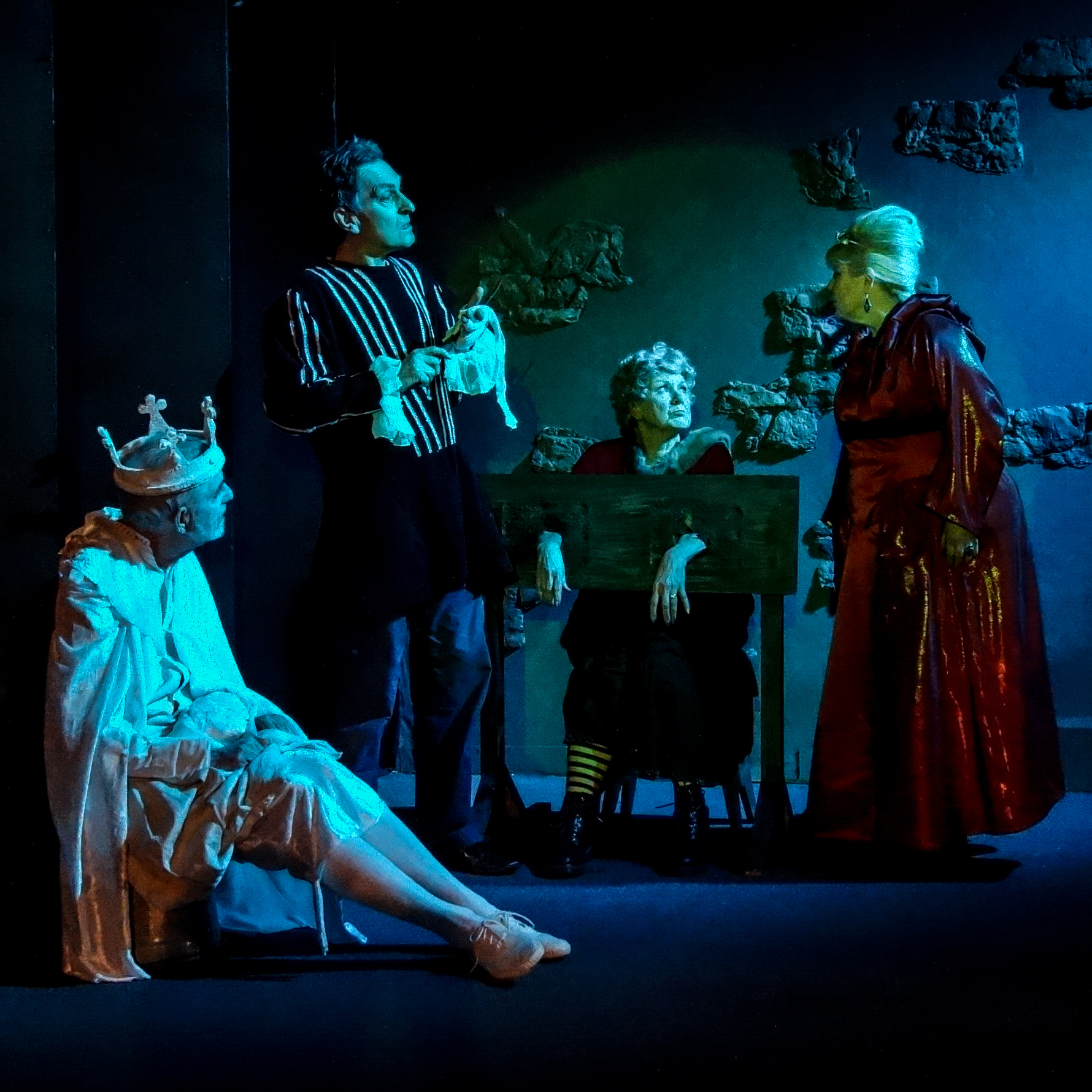
A scene from the play Wyrd Sisters performed by the amateur theatre group Thorpe Players in Surrey, UK

There are numerous adaptations, including:

- An animated version and a 4-part BBC Radio 4 dramatisation first aired in 1995 (starring Sheila Hancock as Granny Weatherwax, Lynda Baron as Nanny Ogg, and Deborah Berlin as Magrat Garlick). The radio version added details not in the book, such as the first arrival of the players in Lancre, when a sarcastic Hwel the dwarf is sent to sleep in the stables apart from humans. The character of Lady Felmet is more bloodthirsty, with a fondness for being "bound, and corseted".
- A play adaptation by Stephen Briggs, who has written a new adaptation to mark Discworld's 25th Anniversary
- A film script by Martin Jameson (text published 1997), directed and produced by Jean Flynn for Channel 4.
- Cosgrove Hall Films produced a six-part animated television adaptation, which was first broadcast by Channel 4 on 18 May 1997. An all-star cast consisted of Christopher Lee (as Death), Jane Horrocks (as Magrat Garlick), June Whitfield (as Nanny Ogg), and Annette Crosbie (as Granny Weatherwax).

== See also ==
- Wyrd

Reading order guide
Preceded by Sourcery	6th Discworld Novel	Succeeded by Pyramids
Preceded by Equal Rites	2nd Witches Story; Published in 1988	Succeeded by Witches Abroad
