= Nanny Ogg =

Fictional character of the Discworld novels

Gytha Ogg
- Discworld character
- First appearance: Wyrd Sisters (1988)
- Last appearance: The Shepherd's Crown (2015)
- Created by: Terry Pratchett
- Based on: The Wife of Bath (partially)
- Voiced by: June Whitfield; Lynda Baron

In-universe information
- Occupation: Witch
- Affiliation: Granny Weatherwax; Magrat Garlick; Agnes Nitt; Jason Ogg; Shawn Ogg; Tiffany Aching
- Spouses: Albert Ogg; Winston Ogg; Sobriety Ogg
- Children: 15
- Home: Lancre

Gytha Ogg (usually called Nanny Ogg) is a character from Terry Pratchett's Discworld series. She is a witch and a member of the Lancre Coven. Gytha is known for her practical approach to magic and her no-nonsense attitude. She is also renowned for her culinary skills and is an excellent cook. Gytha Ogg is often depicted as a strong, capable, and independent character, with a sharp sense of humor. She frequently appears in the Discworld series, particularly in the books featuring the Lancre witches.

== Personality ==
The character of Nanny Ogg is based on someone Pratchett knew in real life, "an old lady who liked a drink and a laugh, but...I suspect you could find someone like her on any street." Discworld illustrator Paul Kidby expressed a similar view of the character, writing, "I like to think we all know someone like Nanny Ogg, a person who enjoys a drink and has led a happy and full life."

Nanny Ogg has been married three times, and is the mother of fifteen children and has many grandchildren and great-grandchildren. She has a talent for getting along with others. As described in Maskerade, after knowing her for fifteen minutes, people feel as if they have known her all of their lives.

=== Comparison with Granny ===
Nanny Ogg is a more down-to-earth character than Esme Weatherwax. Granny Weatherwax comes across as judgmental, whereas Nanny is broadminded. She appears to be kinder than Granny but is prepared to make tough decisions if necessary. Incurring Nanny's wrath is suggested to be dangerous because of her kind personality. In Pratchett's short story "The Sea and Little Fishes" Nanny Ogg also identifies herself, and the Ogg family as a whole, as having immense natural magical talent, but less willing to work hard than the Weatherwaxes.

Unlike Granny Weatherwax, and the stereotype of witches in general, Nanny Ogg does not live in an isolated cottage but in a well-looked-after townhouse in the capital of Lancre with her eldest and youngest sons living to either side. Her house is called Tir Nani Ogg ("Nanny Ogg's place", and a pun on the Tír na nÓg, the Gaelic name for the Land of the Ever-Young). She shares this home with Greebo, a tomcat of evil aura and aroma and astonishing viciousness, whom she still sees as a sweet kitten.

=== Exploits ===
Nanny enjoys food and drink, despite only having one remaining tooth. Within the Discworld universe, Nanny has written several books: The Joye of Snacks (a cookbook of aphrodisiac recipes, the publication of which plays a role in the plot of Maskerade), Mother Ogg's Tales For Tiny Folk and Nanny Ogg's Cookbook.

When she is drunk and/or bathing, Nanny sings bawdy songs such as "The Hedgehog Can Never Be Buggered At All" or "The Hedgehog Song." Only a few lines appear in the Discworld books, but many readers have written their versions. Another Nanny Ogg song is "A Wizard's Staff has a Knob on the End," a version of which has been written by Heather Wood, with music by Dave Greenslade. It is also notable that Nanny Ogg once gave Agnes Nitt lessons on how to sing, including how to sing in harmony with herself (using her alter ego, Perdita).

Nanny Ogg is known for her romantic exploits. She has a very cheerful, practical attitude regarding sexuality and frequently offers unsolicited advice and anecdotes. As a young woman, she was the muse and subject of Leonard of Quirm's masterpiece, the Mona Ogg. While she had numerous sexual partners as an unmarried woman and later as a widow, she claims that she was never unfaithful to any of her husbands while married.

Nanny Ogg is very funny and has a tremendous laugh. She has also been credited with a grin "that should have been locked up for the sake of public decency" and her face has been described as looking like "a friendly pumpkin."

== Role and power ==
The witches of the Lancre coven reflect the roles of Maiden, Mother, and Crone, with Nanny Ogg as the Mother. Nuttall observes that, while some of the Discworld witch characters progress through these roles, Nanny is associated "purely with the role of the Mother." In addition to being the matriarch of a large family, Nanny also fulfills a Mother role in the community; "she is a talented midwife, and takes a maternal attitude to the majority of people she meets". In Thief of Time, Nanny Ogg is acknowledged as the best midwife in the world, and has experience with non-human species like trolls. She briefly takes on young Tiffany Aching as an apprentice after the death of Tiffany's previous mentor, Miss Treason.

While Nanny Ogg's bawdy sense of humor and sexually active past "would seem to contradict her association with the role of Mother", Nuttall points to this as evidence that Nanny "never truly fitted the role of Maiden" and that the character "represents female sexuality as powerful, natural, and something to be celebrated". Even in old age, she enjoys flirting and male attention, such as with the dwarf Casanunda.

Nanny Ogg has impressive social skills, and often relies upon these rather than witchcraft to gather information or persuade others. Throughout the series she demonstrates the ability to socialize with all kinds of people, which sometimes leaves Granny wondering 'if Gytha has some sort of special magic'. In The Art of Discworld, Pratchett writes, "I've always suspected that Nanny is, deep down, the most powerful of the witches, and part of her charm lies in the way she prevents people from finding this out."

== Family ==
Nanny Ogg is the matriarch of her vast extended family. Although she is an affectionate mother and grandmother, Nanny is a tyrant to her daughters-in-law and orders them to perform household chores.

Nanny Ogg claims in Lords and Ladies that her ancestors invented the ancient language of Oggham, the Discworld equivalent of the ancient Irish alphabet Ogham.

Several of Nanny's relatives play supporting roles in the Discworld books. Many others are mentioned briefly.

=== Jason Ogg ===
Eldest son of Nanny Ogg, first mentioned in Wyrd Sisters. Like his father before him, he is the Lancre blacksmith. He is also the leader of the Lancre Morris Men, who treat Morris dancing as something between a contact sport and a martial art.

Jason is something of a gentle giant (somewhat like Constable Bluejohn), and very deferential and respectful to his mother and other witches.

=== Shawn Ogg ===
Youngest son of Nanny Ogg. First appears in Wyrd Sisters as a guard at Lancre Castle. He later becomes Lancre's entire army, as well as the civil service and most of the palace staff. According to Nanny Ogg's Cookbook, he has been granted the Order of the Lancrastian Empire. He is also notable for inventing the Lancrastian Army Knife.

=== Shane Ogg ===
Nanny's grandson, Shane is a sailor and has taught her some 'basic foreign language', mostly made up of mangled words from French and other European languages.

=== Neville Ogg ===
Neville is a thief and (prior to the events of Maskerade) stole all the lead from the roof of the Ankh-Morpork Opera House. Afterward he hid at Mrs. Palm's establishment. When Nanny Ogg and Granny Weatherwax visit Ankh-Morpork in Maskerade, they also seek lodging with Mrs. Palm, and are surprised to learn that this is a brothel rather than a boarding house.

== Adaptations ==
In the Wyrd Sisters animated adaptation, Nanny Ogg was voiced by June Whitfield. In the BBC Radio 4 adaptation of Wyrd Sisters, she was played by Lynda Baron.

== Reception and legacy ==
Nanny Ogg, along with Rincewind, was pictured on first-class Royal Mail stamps in March 2011.

In The Art of Discworld, Pratchett mentions a fossil species of Mesozoic ginkgo known as Ginkgoites nannyoggiae.
