= Overlord (disambiguation) =

An overlord in the English feudal system was a lord of a manor who had subinfeudated a particular manor, estate or fee, to a tenant.

Overlord may also refer to:

== History ==
- Operation Overlord, codename for the invasion of Normandy by Allied forces during World War II
- Overlord system, popular name for structure of British government 1951–1953

== Arts and entertainment ==
=== Film ===
- Overlord (1975 film), a 1975 black and white film directed by Stuart Cooper
- Overlord (2018 film), a horror film

=== Television ===
==== Characters and concepts ====
- Overlord, villains in the animated TV series Blackstar
- "Over Lord", an alternate name for "Invasion of the Capital", an episode of the TV series RahXephon

==== Episodes ====
- "Overlord", Manhattan season 2, episode 4 (2015)
- "Overlord", Overhaulin' season 3, episode 17 (2006)
- "Overlord", World War II in Colour episode 9 (2009)
- "Overlords", Star Wars: The Clone Wars season 3, episode 15 (2011)
- "The Overlord", V: The Series episode 7 (1984)
- "The Overlords", Childhood's End episode 1 (2015)

==== Shows ====
- Overlord (anime), a Japanese anime series

=== Fiction ===
- Overlord (comics), a comic-book character from Image Comics
- The Overlord, a comic-book character from Marvel Comics
- Overlord (novel series), a Japanese light novel series
- Overlord (Transformers), a robot supervillain character in the Transformers robot superhero franchise.
- Overlord (G.I. Joe), a fictional villain in the G.I. Joe universe
- Overlords, an alien species resembling Satan in the 1953 science fiction book Childhood's End by Arthur C. Clarke
- The Overlord (Ninjago), a character in Ninjago

=== Video games ===
- Overlord (1990 video game), a 1990 strategy computer game
- Overlord (1994 video game), a World War II flight simulator for the Amiga and PC by Rowan Software
- Overlord (video game series), an action/adventure video game series by Codemasters
  - Overlord (2007 video game), an action/adventure game for the PC, PlayStation 3, and Xbox 360
  - Overlord: Raising Hell, an expansion to the 2007 game
  - Overlord II, sequel to the 2007 game
  - Overlord: Dark Legend, for the Nintendo Wii
  - Overlord: Minions, for the Nintendo DS
  - Overlord: Fellowship of Evil, a spin-off released in 2015
- Mass Effect 2: Overlord, a 2010 downloadable content pack for the video game Mass Effect 2

=== Other entertainment ===
- Overlord (band), a Brooklyn-based indie pop band led by George Pasles
- Overlord (wargame), a 1973 board wargame
- "Overlord", a song by Black Label Society from the album Order of the Black
- "Overlord", a song by Psapp from The Monster Song
- Ariakon Overlord, a paintball pistol
- Overlord: D-Day and the Battle for Normandy, a history book by Max Hastings
- Overlord (song), a 2015 single by Lamb of God

== Other uses ==
- Mount Overlord, an extinct volcano in Antarctica
- Overlord Mountain, a mountain in British Columbia, Canada
- Overlord meme, an Internet meme relating to mock submission
- Overlord, a software project managed by Red Hat for JBoss Fuse Service Works

== See also ==
- Dark lord, a fantastical archetype of immense villainy and power
