= Tiffany Aching's Guide to Being a Witch =

Discworld tie-in book by Rhianna Pratchett and Gabrielle Kent

- Authors: Rhianna Pratchett & Gabrielle Kent
- Illustrator: Paul Kidby
- Cover artist: Paul Kidby
- Publisher: Penguin Random House
- Publication date: 9 November, 2023
- Pages: 200
- ISBN: 978-0-241-65199-5

Tiffany Aching’s Guide to Being a Witch is a guide to witchcraft written from the in-world perspective of Discworld character Tiffany Aching, with annotations from other characters from the Discworld novels including the witches Granny Weatherwax and Nanny Ogg.

== Background ==
Tiffany Aching’s Guide to Being a Witch was written by Rhianna Pratchett, daughter of Discworld creator Terry Pratchett, and Gabrielle Kent, a children’s book author. It was illustrated by long-time official Discworld artist Paul Kidby. It is notably Rhianna’s first published Discworld work; she had previously written many things behind the scenes, including a screenplay for an adaptation of The Wee Free Men completed in 2014 that remains unproduced.

The book was published to celebrate twenty years of the character of Tiffany Aching, who first appeared in the 2003 Discworld novel The Wee Free Men. It is the first Discworld book to take place after the final novel in the series, The Shepherd's Crown, though the fictional manuscript was mostly written before the events of that book, allowing a deceased character to be present.

Tiffany Aching’s Guide was announced on 12 May, 2023 via social media. Originally scheduled for 26 October, its release was delayed by Typhoon Saola, and it was eventually published on 9 November, 2023. It was launched with an event at the British Library as part of the exhibition Fantasy: Realms of the Imagination on 27 October.

Like other Discworld tie-ins including Nanny Ogg's Cookbook, it is presented as though published in the fictional city of Ankh-Morpork. It makes reference to many characters and events from throughout the Discworld novels, though primarily from the Witches and Tiffany sub-series.
