= The Wee Free Men =

2003 Discworld novel by Terry Pratchett

- First edition
- Author: Terry Pratchett
- Cover artist: Paul Kidby
- Language: English
- Series: Discworld; 30th novel – 1st Tiffany Aching story
- Subject: Characters: Tiffany Aching, Nac Mac Feegle, Granny Aching, Miss Tick; Locations: The Chalk, Fairyland
- Genre: Fantasy
- Publisher: Doubleday
- Publication date: 2003
- Awards: WH Smith Teen Choice Award 2003; American Library Association's Best Book For Young Adults 2004; Parenting Book of the Year Award 2003; Center for Children's Books' Blue Ribbon; Locus Award for Best Young Adult Book 2004
- ISBN: 0-385-60533-1
- Preceded by: Night Watch
- Followed by: Monstrous Regiment

The Wee Free Men is a 2003 comic fantasy novel by British writer Terry Pratchett, which takes place in his Discworld setting. It is labelled a "Story of Discworld" to indicate its status as children's or young adult fiction, unlike most of the books in the Discworld series. A sequel, A Hat Full of Sky, appeared in 2004 (both books were republished in a combined edition, The Wee Free Men: The Beginning, in August 2010); a third book called Wintersmith appeared in 2006; and the fourth, I Shall Wear Midnight, was released in September 2010. The final book in the series, The Shepherd's Crown, was released in 2015.

While Terry Pratchett's first Discworld book for children, The Amazing Maurice and his Educated Rodents had swearing translated to rat language, in this book it is in the dialect of the Nac Mac Feegle which is taken from Scots and Scottish Gaelic.

An illustrated edition of the novel, with pictures by Stephen Player, appeared in print on 2 October 2008.

== Plot summary ==
Tiffany Aching is a 9-year-old girl who literally sees things differently from others. While playing by the river near her home, she sees two tiny blue, kilted men who warn her of a "green heid" in the water. Suddenly a vile green monster, Jenny Greenteeth, appears in the water. Using her brother Wentworth as bait, Tiffany ambushes the beast and cracks it with a frying pan, while Wentworth is completely unfazed, as he is unable to see either the little men or the monster. She goes into town to visit a travelling teacher and comes upon Miss Tick, a witch who has been watching her. Tiffany is told that these little men are the Nac Mac Feegles, who are rough and rowdy fae folk who speak in Scots. Miss Tick informs her that she is likely the witch of the wold she resides in, and gives her the toad familiar she carries as a guide before tricking Tiffany out of the tent and disappearing.

Tiffany returns home to discover that the Nac Mac Feegles are not only incredibly fast and strong, but afraid of her, as she catches them stealing eggs from under a chicken and a sheep right out of the field. When Wentworth is kidnapped by the Queen of the Fairies, Tiffany seeks out the help of the Nac Mac Feegles to rescue him, as they are the most powerful otherworldly things she knows and they're more than willing to submit to her will, terrified by one who is not only a witch but one who can read and write. Rob Anybody, and a group of other Feegles including Big Yan and Daft Wullie take her back to their home where she meets the buzzard-aviator Hamish, the bard-Feegle William, and their clan leader the Kelda. Tiffany is told that her brother has been taken by the Queen to her domain in Fairyland, and not only must she take the Feegles to go rescue him, but she must also take up the reins as Kelda, as the current one is about to die. After worming her way out of marrying Rob Anybody, Tiffany goes out of the mound to the field where the Feegles test her First Sight and Second Thoughts by letting her find the entrance to the queen's domain.

Once in, Tiffany and the Feegles face several large wolves who the Feegles handily clobber, and several dream-causing blob-people called dromes. Going through drome-caused dreams, she finds Roland, the son of the Baron of her homeland. Tiffany and Roland go through several dreams and the normal dreamscape to eventually find a dream with both Wentworth and the Queen in it. Tiffany narrowly escapes defeat at the hands of the Queen's dream-minions by having Roland release the Feegles from their trapping in a large walnut, and they escape from that dream into one of Tiffany's imagining. Once in that dream, the Feegles and Wentworth are presumed to have perished at the hands of the Queen's trickery, and Tiffany escapes with Roland's unconscious body out back into the dreamscape, heading for the exit, full of regret that she could not save her friends. The Queen mocks her inability to save them and her insecurities, but Tiffany reconnects with her homeland's heritage to gain the strength to defeat the Queen at her own game of dreams in the darkest hour. The Feegles who she later meets back up with reveal that the trap the Queen had set was not nearly enough to stop the Feegles, and that they and Wentworth are both fine. Tiffany, Roland, Wentworth and the Feegles all return to their homeland, where the Baron mistakenly gives his son all of the credit for saving them, which Tiffany ends up being okay with.

Another large influence on the narrative of the story and development of Tiffany's character is her Granny Aching, a hard working, silent, and knowledgeable shepherd. She was the book's definition of a witch. Stories and memories of her are mentioned here and there in the book, and her memory helps Tiffany defeat the Queen at the end.

== Characters ==
- Tiffany Aching
- Wentworth Aching
- Granny Aching
- Perspicacia Tick
- The Nac Mac Feegle
- The Chalk Hill Clan
- Rob Anybody
- Daft Wullie
- William the Gonnagle
- The Kelda of the Chalk Hill Clan
- Toad
- The Queen
- The Baron
- No'-As-Big-As-Medium-Jock-But-Bigger-Than-Wee-Jock-Jock

== Film ==
In January 2006, reports emerged that director Sam Raimi had signed up to make a movie based on this novel with a script by Pamela Pettler, the writer of Tim Burton's Corpse Bride. Sony Pictures Entertainment had recently acquired the rights to the book. In a June 2008 interview, Pratchett said "I saw a script that I frankly thought was awful. It seemed to be Wee Free Men in name only. It had all the hallmarks of something that had been good, and then the studio had got involved. It probably won't get made." In December 2009, Pratchett said that he had "got back The Wee Free Men".

In 2013, Terry Pratchett's daughter Rhianna Pratchett announced that she would be adapting Wee Free Men into a film. In 2016 it was confirmed that the film will be developed in association with The Jim Henson Company.

== Reception ==
The Wee Free Men was listed in TIME's 2020 collection The 100 Best Fantasy Books of All Time, the only novel by Pratchett alone to make that list (his other entry being Good Omens, a collaboration with Neil Gaiman).

== See also ==
- The Fairy Feller's Master-Stroke, painting that inspired a section of the book

Reading order guide
Preceded by Night Watch	30th Discworld Novel	Succeeded by Monstrous Regiment
Preceded by None	1st Tiffany Aching Story; Published in 2003	Succeeded by A Hat Full of Sky
