= Overlord: Fellowship of Evil =

2015 video game

- Developer: Codemasters
- Publisher: Codemasters
- Writers: Rhianna Pratchett; Carl Johnson
- Composers: Michiel van den Bos; Mark Knight
- Series: Overlord
- Platforms: Microsoft Windows; PlayStation 4 Xbox One
- Release: October 20, 2015
- Genre: Action role-playing
- Modes: Single-player, multiplayer

Overlord: Fellowship of Evil is a 2015 fantasy action role-playing game developed and published by Codemasters. It is a spin-off of the Overlord series and was released on October 20, 2015 for Microsoft Windows, PlayStation 4 and Xbox One to mostly negative reviews. As of May 2026, this game remains the last non-racing video game released by Codemasters.

== Gameplay ==
A gameplay screenshot of the game

Overlord: Fellowship of Evil is an action role-playing video game. Unlike the original Overlord and Overlord II, the perspective of the game is shifted from third-person to an isometric top-down perspective, similar to the Nintendo DS game Overlord: Minions. Players can choose to play as one of the four Netherghūls, including Inferna, a warrior who can attack enemies with swords, Malady, a sorcerer and a necromancer, a rogue called Hakon and Dark Elf Prince Cryos, who can create area-of-effect attacks. They can choose to play as different characters in different levels. Players can also call Minions to the battle. They can help and assist players in combat, as well as providing them protection. Players can choose from four types of Minions, namely Browns, Reds, Greens and Blues. Each of them is equipped with different skills, and players can decide when to use them. In addition, levels are generated procedurally, and loot can be collected. All the four characters can be upgraded by visiting a statue in the game's hub. Players can also craft their own weapons by visiting a weaponsmith called Ricket.

The game also supports four-player co-operative multiplayer, in which players play as the four Netherghūls to battle against enemies. While players can play co-operatively to complete levels, they can eliminate and kill other players, similar to the Magicka series and take their resources. Both local multiplayer and online multiplayer are supported.

== Setting ==
The game is set a few centuries after the events of Overlord II, and the world is plagued by goodness, including the Minions' home. In order to reclaim their world and bring back evil, Gnarl, the chief minion, resurrects and reawakens four fallen servants of the dark arts. These servants are tasked to recover the world and bring balance back to it.

== Development ==
A new game set in the Overlord installment was teased by Codemasters through Twitter on March 21, 2015. The game was officially announced a month later on April 23, 2015 alongside an official gameplay trailer. According to Rob Elser, an executive producer from Codemasters, allowing players to play as an "evil" character has always been a goal for them, and they would like to achieve it through Fellowship of Evil. It was considered as a spin-off in the series instead of a proper sequel to Overlord II because the team wanted to introduce some drastic changes to the franchise's formula. The team hoped that they can create something "exciting" by introducing new characters, story and other new additions. According to the developer, they wanted to add alterations to the game, while remain faithful to the past installments. As a result, the world and tone of the game remained unchanged. They also brought back returning characters like Gnarl (voiced by Marc Silk). In addition, they hired Rhianna Pratchett, the writer of Overlord II, to write the story and plot of Fellowship of Evil. She co-wrote the storyline with Carl Johnson. The game received strong criticism for not being Overlord 3. Pratchett responded by saying that the development of Fellowship of Evil would not diminish the opportunity of Overlord 3 being developed. She hoped, that fans can consider it as Lara Croft and the Guardian of Light and Lara Croft and the Temple of Osiris to the major Tomb Raider franchise.

Overlord: Fellowship of Evil was originally set to be released for Microsoft Windows, PlayStation 4 and Xbox One on September 29, 2015 through a digital format. However, it was later delayed to October 20, 2015. Players who pre-ordered the game gained access to nine different hats, which are inspired by Team Fortress 2, for their in-game minions, as well as a digital artbook which displays several concept arts of the game.

== Reception ==
Reception

Aggregate score
Aggregator	Score
Metacritic	PC: 24/100; XONE: 36/100; PS4: 33/100

Review scores
Publication	Score
Destructoid	1.5/10
Eurogamer	Avoid
Hardcore Gamer	2/5

Reactions to the game were largely negative. Eurogamer stated in their review: "Fans hoping for a revival of a cult favourite will be crushed, of course, but sadly newcomers are unlikely to find anything to enjoy either." James Stephanie Sterling of The Jimquisition awarded it a score of 1 out of 10, saying "Overlord: Fellowship of Evil has no charm, and is far from entertaining." Destructoid warned fans of the previous games in the series to simply "forget this game ever existed, you’ll be better off having never played it." They criticised the "mindless" combat, "ugly" graphics, poor camera controls, superfluous loot mechanics and myriad technical issues, with the writing and voice acting being the game's only redeeming qualities.
