= Tiffany Aching =

Fictional character of the Discworld novels

- Discworld character
- Tiffany in The Wee Free Men, as drawn by Paul Kidby
- First appearance: The Wee Free Men
- Created by: Terry Pratchett

In-universe information
- Affiliation: The Nac Mac Feegle; Granny Weatherwax; Nanny Ogg, other witches

Tiffany Aching is a fictional character in Terry Pratchett's satirical Discworld series of fantasy novels. Her name in Nac Mac Feegle is Tir-far-thóinn or 'Land Under Wave'.

Tiffany is a trainee witch whose growth into her job forms one of the many arcs in the Discworld series. She is the main character in The Wee Free Men, A Hat Full of Sky, Wintersmith, I Shall Wear Midnight and The Shepherd's Crown. Tiffany grows up over the course of the series, from nine years old in The Wee Free Men to being in her late teens in The Shepherd's Crown.

== Works ==
Beginning with The Wee Free Men in 2003, the main Discworld books featuring Tiffany Aching are:

- The Wee Free Men – 2003
- A Hat Full of Sky – 2004
- Wintersmith – 2006
- I Shall Wear Midnight – 2010
- The Shepherd's Crown – 2015

Tiffany is also the in-universe author of the tie-in book Tiffany Aching’s Guide to Being a Witch by Rhianna Pratchett and Gabrielle Kent, published in 2023 in part to celebrate twenty years of the character.

== Creation ==
It sounds amateurish to say that characters invent themselves, and in truth they don't. That's just a short-hand phrase. Of course the author invents them. But while the creative channel is being held open, all sorts of memories and thoughts creep out, somewhat to the owner's surprise.

— Terry Pratchett on Tiffany's creation

Pratchett once said that Tiffany Aching "started with a girl lying down by a river, on the first page of The Wee Free Men". In his youth, Pratchett was "fascinated" by a nearby chalk pit, and like Tiffany knew how to read words before being able to pronounce them. The Wee Free Men features "a lot of [his] past" in its descriptions. A lot of Tiffany's understanding of the world is based on Pratchett's own experiences.

With Tiffany, Pratchett wanted to "restate" the purpose of magic on the Discworld and the relationship between wizards, witches and others. He included ideas of responsibility and "guarding your society" as he felt it drew closer to the reality of a witch – that is, "the village herbalist, the midwife, the person who knew things"; like a designated driver, a witch is her community's 'designated sensible person'. Pratchett found a young protagonist useful, because when one is young "you have to learn". The name "Tiffany" was chosen deliberately, to be poorly evocative of a witch.

== Character history ==
A young witch (9 during The Wee Free Men, 11 in A Hat Full of Sky, 12 and 13 in Wintersmith, almost 16 in I Shall Wear Midnight, and in her late teens in The Shepherd's Crown), Tiffany hails from the Chalk, a Barony and a region of Downland Rimward of the Ramtops. Her family the Achings are the tenants of the Home Farm of the local Barony, the de Chumsfanleigh (pronounced "de Chuffley"). Her late grandmother, Sarah 'Granny' Aching (who died 2 years prior to the events in The Wee Free Men), was a shepherdess, and by Ramtop standards she was also a witch, although witchcraft was frowned upon on the Chalk until Tiffany openly practised it. Granny Aching was a friend of the Chalk's Clan of Nac Mac Feegles (an army of tiny, tattooed in blue colour, rowdy, drunken and vaguely Scottish 'pictsies'), and they have befriended Tiffany as the new "hag o' the hills". As Tiffany filled in as their Kelda (Queen) for a short time, the Nac Mac Feegle continue to see her as their responsibility, and there is no time in Tiffany's life since then when they have not (in)discreetly watched her.

Tiffany begins her witching career at nine, upon being scouted out by the "witch finder" Miss Tick, after things from Fairyland begin making an entrance. She later leads the Feegles on a journey into Fairyland to rescue Wentworth, her toddler-age brother, as well as Roland, the young son of the local Baron, from the Queen of the Elves. For this she earns the respect of Granny Weatherwax, a significant achievement in itself. Although Tiffany is too young at the time to be an official witch, Granny gives her an imaginary invisible hat to boost her confidence. Such is the power of belief on the Disc that this hat keeps off the rain.

Two years later, Tiffany travels up to Lancre to be formally apprenticed to a witch, Miss Level. During her time with Miss Level, Tiffany uses the words "see me" to exit her body and see herself, believing it to be a harmless trick. Her body becomes vulnerable to infestation by a "hiver," (a gestalt entity of minds from the dawn of time) which uses her power to harm and cause chaos, using Tiffany's suppressed thoughts and desires as a basis. She eventually manages to overcome the hiver by giving it what it truly wants: the ability to die.

Tiffany Aching in The Shepherd's Crown, as drawn by Paul Kidby. Tiffany ages as the series goes on.

At the age of thirteen, while studying under Miss Treason, Tiffany accidentally attracts the romantic interests of the Wintersmith after unwittingly playing the role of the Summer Lady at the Autumn Morris Dance (the so-called Dark Morris). She is at first ambivalent towards the Wintersmith, unnerved by the attention, but also somewhat flattered that she has caught the eye of a godlike being. The Wintersmith continues its advances, even attempting to create a human body out of snow and miscellaneous elements using a recipe from a children's song.

Tiffany, after some advice from Nanny Ogg about the power a young woman has over a suitor, manages to control the Wintersmith for a time. However, eventually he gains the upper hand and brings a record-breaking snow and cold to the Chalk in what should be early spring, threatening the new lambs. Tiffany melts him using a trick taught by Granny Weatherwax, fulfilling her temporary role as the Summer Lady and allowing the real one, brought from the Underworld by Roland, to resume her role. After Miss Treason's death, she is briefly apprenticed to Nanny Ogg before returning to the Chalk and taking up the job of witch to the Chalk.

When Tiffany is in her late teens, Granny Weatherwax dies, leaving a note recommending that Tiffany take over her steading. Though at first she splits her time between there and the Chalk, she eventually leaves the steading to the care of Geoffrey, a young man she had been training to become a witch. She builds for herself her own shepherd's carding hut by hand, re-using the iron wheels which remained after Granny Aching's hut was burned.

== Powers and abilities ==
As a witch, Tiffany possesses First Sight, the ability to see "what is really there" (as opposed to second sight, which shows people what they think ought to be there). She also possesses Second Thoughts, which are defined as "the thoughts you think about the way you think". Whilst other witches are said to have this trait as well, Tiffany also recognizes some of her thoughts as Third Thoughts (the thoughts one thinks about the way one thinks about the way one thinks), and Fourth Thoughts (the thoughts one thinks about the way one thinks about the way one thinks about the way one thinks). All these thoughts sometimes cause Tiffany to walk into door frames.

Like her grandmother, she appears to have a symbiotic, spiritual link with the hill lands on which she lives, and as such has shown herself to be strongly protective of the region and all its inhabitants. On several occasions, Tiffany has induced in herself a state of total mental clarity, becoming completely aware of every sensation, life-form and object around her, including the land itself. It is also hinted at that the Chalk itself can, likewise, 'Borrow' the witch it 'Chose', having once temporarily spoken through Tiffany, telling her childhood friend, Roland, that she would marry him (and later performing an ancient marriage ceremony on Roland and his fiancée Letitia).

Tiffany has shown skill in many of the same areas of magic as Granny Weatherwax (though generally to a lesser degree): she has precociously mastered the art of Borrowing (the art of stepping outside one's own self), though Tiffany did not recognise it at the time, and merely used it as a means of viewing herself when without a mirror. The resulting vacancy of her body was what attracted the hiver to possess her in A Hat Full of Sky. In Wintersmith she demonstrates a high level of skill in the art of magical self-concealment, and also learns how to absorb heat from any available source (including the sun) and channel it out into the world, without being touched by it herself. She generally precedes the use of the latter art with a sort of mantra, in which she states that she willingly chooses to undertake the dangerous action, and is prepared to accept full responsibility for all its consequences. Also like Granny, she has great difficulty in constructing the magical devices known as 'shambles', though unlike Granny, she later overcomes this obstacle. Tiffany has also demonstrated an affinity for using fire, which she considers a friend (most witches do not consider fire to have good associations for them in view of its history).

In I Shall Wear Midnight it is revealed that in the future, Tiffany is able to exert a limited amount of influence over events throughout the timeline with the help of Eskarina Smith, the main character of Equal Rites.

Tiffany is very skilled at making cheese; and owns one particular Blue Lancre, named Horace, which habitually eats mice. She has read the entire dictionary, although she sometimes has difficulty with pronunciation. Tiffany also has a talent with languages, a side effect of the encounter with the Hiver. The occupation of her mind by the creature that collected minds has left her with shadows of those memories, including a deceased, didactic wizard named Sensibility Bustle, who translates any foreign word inside her head upon hearing or seeing it. Tiffany is also able to hear "Spill Words", the words almost spoken but left unsaid, a skill she learnt from Mrs Proust. This skill is often mistaken for the ability to read minds.

At the climax of events in I Shall Wear Midnight, it is revealed that Tiffany, as the Witch of the Chalk, also has powers and authority not unlike a Justice of the peace; she is able to perform binding marriage ceremonies, and judge and deal out punishment onto the deserving.

== Relationships ==
Tiffany is the seventh of the Aching children, and the second youngest, the youngest child being her only brother, Wentworth. Both her parents are alive, but she attracts little attention around the house, because she does her job well, which means nobody ever has to come and fuss over her, which in turn means nobody ever pays a lot of attention to her. While she does not particularly like her brother, she sets out to rescue him because he is her brother.

She is friends with several of the Nac Mac Feegle, including Rob Anybody (originally, but accidentally, her betrothed), Daft Wullie (somewhat clueless), William the Gonnagle, Hamish, and Not-as-big-as-Medium-sized-Jock-but-bigger-than-Wee-Jock Jock.

While training in Lancre, she attended a coven of young witches 'led' by Annagramma Hawkin. Tiffany and fellow coven members Lucy Warbeck and Petulia Gristle eventually acquit themselves well as witches; Annagramma, however, finds that her training, under the tutelage of Letice Earwig, had not been enough to prepare her for the reality of witching life, and her onetime coven subordinates agree to help her get on her feet.

Roland comes to have great affection for Tiffany and takes the role of the mythic hero, attempting to rescue her from the Underworld and from the romantic attentions of the Wintersmith. Tiffany herself denies having any affection for Roland, but there are many signs that she does have feelings for him, even though she does not admit it until pressured to by Nanny Ogg. However, both eventually recognise that their both being different from everybody else did not mean they had anything in common, and Roland eventually married a local noblewoman (and latent witch) Letitia Keepsake.

During the fourth book, I Shall Wear Midnight, it is revealed near the end that she has entered into a romantic relationship with an intelligent young guard, named Preston, who aspires to study medicine at the Lady Sybil Free Hospital down in the city of Ankh-Morpork, under Dr John Lawn, and further wishes to start a medical practice of his own up in the Chalk.

In The Shepherd's Crown, Tiffany is still romantically attached to Preston, who has become a surgeon, though, given their devotion to their jobs, they rarely have time to see each other. She visits him in Ankh-Morpork, and they write letters.

Tiffany is mentored by Granny Weatherwax, and is named her successor. Granny Weatherwax, who is notoriously difficult to please, has several times been impressed by her.

Eskarina Smith, the protagonist of Equal Rites, tells Tiffany in I Shall Wear Midnight that they become close friends. Eskarina uses her time travelling abilities to facilitate a meeting between Tiffany and her older self.

== Reception ==
Tim Martin of The Telegraph called Tiffany one of Pratchett's ten best Discworld characters, criticising I Shall Wear Midnight but calling the first three Aching novels "some of the best Discworld stuff in years". On the occasion of Pratchett's death in 2015, the Press Association listed Tiffany as Pratchett's seventh greatest character, highlighting her relationship with the Nac Mac Feegle. According to Pratchett, his portrayal of Tiffany led to him being made an honorary Brownie. Pratchett has called the Tiffany Aching books "very close to my heart", and has said they are the books he would like to be "remembered for".
