= Lost Words: Beyond the Page =

2020 video game

- Developer: Sketchbook Games
- Publisher: Modus Games
- Director: Mark Backler
- Writer: Rhianna Pratchett
- Composer: David Housden
- Engine: Unity
- Platforms: Stadia; Switch; PlayStation 4; Windows; Xbox One
- Release: Stadia March 27, 2020; Windows, PS4, Switch, Xbox One April 6, 2021; iOS, Android May 9, 2023
- Genre: Puzzle-platform
- Mode: Single-player

Lost Words: Beyond the Page is a puzzle-platform game developed by Sketchbook Games and published by Modus Games. The game was released for Stadia in March 2020, then for Nintendo Switch, Microsoft Windows, PlayStation 4, and Xbox One in April 2021.

== Plot ==
Isabelle (Izzy) is a young, aspiring writer who keeps a personal journal. The game takes place in Estoria, a fantasy world which emerges from the diary entries that Izzy keeps. The player character is crowned as the Guardian of Fireflies and must restore the fireflies to their village after it has been destroyed by a dragon. The real-world turmoil that affects Izzy's life leads to consequences that affect the fantasy setting of Estoria.

== Gameplay ==
Lost Words is split into two separate gameplay modes, one of which takes place in the fantasy world of Estoria and the other in Izzy's journal. Within the journal, words are used as platforms, which can be used to navigate through Izzy's diary. Asterisks allow the player to read additional text and both words and sketches are used to move to further pages. Words are used by the player to interact with the world by casting spells and solving puzzles. Most of the levels also have fireflies, which can be collected throughout the game.

== Development ==
Lost Words was initially going to explore the effect Izzy's parents' divorce had on her life. The development team later decided to explore themes that were more applicable to a wide audience. The levels of the game are based on the five stages of grief but are presented in a hopeful and optimistic fashion. The story of Lost Words was written by Rhianna Pratchett.

Sketchbook Games also worked with the Wellcome Trust to speak to child psychologists about children going through trauma, and how they develop coping mechanisms for them. The team wanted to create a sense of hope and joy to be found in Izzy's tale and wanted it to have a positive impact on the player.

Modus Games officially unveiled the game at E3 in June 2019. PID Games released it for iOS and Android on May 9, 2023.

== Reception ==
Reception

Aggregate scores
Aggregator	Score
Metacritic	Stadia: 78/100; NS: 79/100; PC: 74/100; PS4: 74/100; XONE: 80/100
OpenCritic	72% recommend

Review score
Publication	Score
Game Informer	7.75/10

Lost Words: Beyond the Page received mixed reviews for the Windows and PlayStation 4 versions, while the Nintendo Switch, Xbox One, Stadia versions received positive reviews, according to the review aggregator website Metacritic. Fellow review aggregator OpenCritic assessed that the game received strong approval, being recommended by 72% of critics.

Vikki Blake of Eurogamer called Lost Words "a simple, flawed yet beautiful adventure". She praised the game's bright and colourful backdrops and the musical scores, which accompanied the player on their journey, by calling them "splendorous". She also praised Pratchett's writing, citing it "is rich with the universal truths we all know and have experienced first-hand". However, she said the game "lack a little challenge and sophistication" and preferred the journal segments over "galloping through Estoria". She ended her review by stating Lost Words "might not be for everyone, granted, but it's a potent, powerful experience nonetheless".

Kimberley Wallace of Game Informer gave Lost Words a 7.75/10, saying the game "is an interesting way to tell an interactive story, venturing into territory that isn't often explored in video games". Wallace disliked the awkward controls and stated technical hiccups "bring down the experience". Despite what she disliked about Lost Words, Wallace went on to state "I'm glad it exists, despite its flaws".
