= Rhianna Pratchett =

English video game writer and journalist

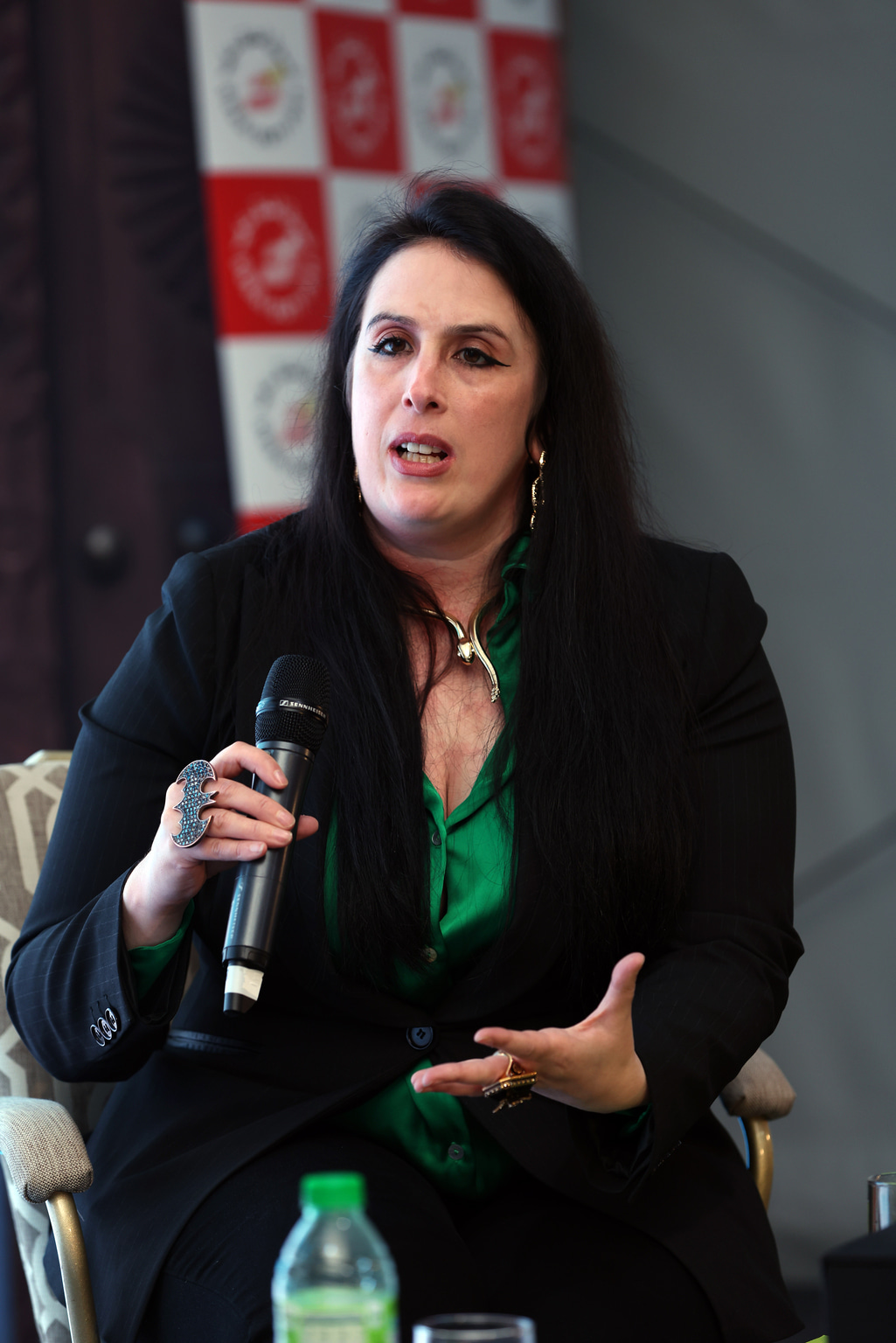
- Pratchett at the 2023 Emirates Airline Festival of Literature
- Born: 30 December 1976 (age 49); Rowberrow, Somerset, England
- Occupation: Writer
- Parents: Sir Terry Pratchett; Lyn Purves
- Writing career
- Genres: Video games, fantasy
- Notable works: Heavenly Sword, Mirror's Edge, Tomb Raider, Rise of the Tomb Raider
- Pratchett's voice from the BBC programme Front Row, 26 December 2013
- Website: rhiannapratchett.com

Rhianna Pratchett (born 30 December 1976) is an English video game writer and journalist. She has worked on Heavenly Sword (2007), Overlord (2007), Mirror's Edge (2008), and Tomb Raider (2013) and its follow-up, Rise of the Tomb Raider (2015), among others. She is the daughter of fantasy writer Terry Pratchett and Lyn Purves.

== Career ==
Rhianna Pratchett studied journalism at the London College of Printing. Following graduation, Pratchett began writing for Minx magazine, where her first game-reviews were published. She moved to the long-running PC Zone magazine as an editorial assistant and staff-writer, eventually becoming a section-editor. She wrote for many other publications including The Guardian.

Pratchett moved into script-writing and narrative design in 2002 with Beyond Divinity, produced by Larian Studios in Belgium. She also wrote a novella to accompany the game. In 2007, her work on Heavenly Sword was nominated for a BAFTA and a year later she won a Writers' Guild of Great Britain 'Best Videogame Script' award for Overlord. Pratchett wrote the comic Tomb Raider: The Beginning with Dark Horse and the Mirror's Edge miniseries with DC Comics, along with several of her own short stories. She has contributed to various books on games narrative including Professional Techniques for Video Game Writing and Game Writing: Narrative Skills for Videogames.

Since 2012, she has been co-director of Narrativia Limited, a production company which holds exclusive multimedia and merchandising rights to her father Terry Pratchett's works following his death. In 2012 and 2013, Narrativia announced that it would be working on three television projects based on Pratchett's father's works: The Watch, Good Omens, and Wee Free Men, as well as several other projects; Pratchett was reported as co-writer of The Watch but in 2019 she announced she had not been involved in the project "for many years". In a deal announced in April 2020, multiple Discworld novels are to be adapted for television by Narrativia, Motive Pictures and Endeavor Content.

She has also spoken on BBC Radio 1, Radio 4, 5Live and multiple conferences around the world, including Develop, Animex, GDC and TEDx Transmedia. In June 2015, she said that her father's 41st Discworld novel The Shepherd's Crown, to be published posthumously later that year, would mark the end of the series, and that no further novels or books of unfinished work would be authorised for publication.

In 2023, Pratchett presented her first radio programme, Mythical Creatures, a ten-part documentary series for BBC Radio 4 about creatures from British folklore. It was first broadcast from 18-29 December 2023.

== Works ==
=== Video games ===
- Beyond Divinity (story editor) - Larian Studios (2004)
- Stronghold Legends (writer) - Firefly Studios/2K (2006)
- Heavenly Sword (co-writer/story) - Ninja Theory/Sony (2007)
- Overlord (writer/audio co-director) - Triumph Studios/Codemasters (2007)
  - Overlord: Raising Hell - expansion pack (2008)
- Viking: Battle for Asgard (writer) - The Creative Assembly/Sega (2008)
- Mirror's Edge (writer) - DICE/EA (2008)
- Prince of Persia (additional writer) - Ubisoft Montreal (2008)
- Overlord: Minions (writer) - Climax/Codemasters (2009)
- Overlord: Dark Legend (writer/voice director) - Climax/Codemasters (2009)
- Overlord II (writer/voice director) - Triumph/Codemasters (2009)
- Risen (co-writer of English localization) - Piranha Bytes/Deep Silver (2009)
- CSI: Fatal Conspiracy (writer) - Telltale/Ubisoft (2010)
- BioShock Infinite and BioShock Infinite: Burial at Sea (additional writer) - Irrational Games/2K (2013)
- Tomb Raider (lead writer) - Crystal Dynamics/SE (2013)
- Beat Buddy: Tale of the Guardians (writer) - Threaks (2013)
- Thief (story and cinematics) - Eidos Montréal (2014)
- Rival Kingdoms (story and characters) (2015)
- Rise of the Tomb Raider (lead writer) - Crystal Dynamics/SE (2015)
- Overlord: Fellowship of Evil (writer) - Codemasters (2015)
- Dance of Death: Du Lac & Fey (story consultant) - Salix Games (2019)
- Lost Words: Beyond the Page (writer) - Sketchbook Games (2019)
- Surgeon Simulator 2 (writer) - Bossa Studios (2020)
- REKA (lead writer) - Emberstorm Entertainment (2024)
- Life Below (writer) - Megapop Games (2026)

=== Gamebooks ===
- Crystal of Storms (Fighting Fantasy) - published by Scholastic (2020)

=== Other books ===
- Campaigns & Companions: The Complete Roleplaying Guide for Pets (with Andi Ewington) - published by Rebellion (2021)
- Tiffany Aching’s Guide to Being a Witch (with Gabrielle Kent) - published by Penguin Books (2023)

=== Tabletop games ===
- Bardsung (lead writer and narrative designer) - Steamforged Games

=== Comics ===
- Mirror's Edge #1 to #6 - published by DC Comics (2008)
- Tomb Raider: The Beginning - published by Dark Horse Comics (2013)
- Legends of Red Sonja #3 - published by Dynamite (2014)
- Tomb Raider #7 to #18 - published by Dark Horse Comics (2014-2015)

=== Film and television ===
Pratchett has appeared in the documentaries Games Britannia, Critical Path and Charlie Brooker's How Video Games Changed the World.

== Achievements ==
- Rise of the Tomb Raider (2015) - Won Outstanding Achievement in Videogame Writing at 68th Writers Guild of America Awards 2016. Won Outstanding Achievement in Character for Lara Croft at 19th Annual D.I.C.E. Awards 2016
- Risen (2009) - co-nominated for a WGGB award 2010.
- Won the European Women in Games Hall of Fame Award in 2013.
