= Nac Mac Feegle =

Fictional group of characters from Terry Pratchett's Discworld-novels

The Nac Mac Feegle (also sometimes known as Pictsies, Wee Free Men, the Little Men or "Person or Persons Unknown, Believed to be Armed") are a type of fairy folk in the fictional world of Terry Pratchett's Discworld series of novels. They appear in the novels Carpe Jugulum, The Wee Free Men, A Hat Full of Sky, Wintersmith, I Shall Wear Midnight, Snuff, and The Shepherd's Crown. At six inches tall, they are seen as occasionally helpful thieves and pests.

All Nac Mac Feegles have hair that is red and skin that is heavily tattooed and covered with (blue) woad. Their tattoos identify their clan. They do not possess wings. According to Pratchett, "They speak a mixture of Gaelic, Old Scots, Glaswegian, and gibberish." They are strong and resilient.

The males are rowdy and spend their time drinking, fighting, and stealing. They are also very superstitious.

== History ==
In The Art of Discworld, Pratchett identifies The Little Grey Men and Down the Bright Stream, both by "BB", the nom-de-plume of Denys Watkins-Pitchford, as possible inspiration, featuring fairies that could talk to creatures, but "there was nothing tinkly about them; they lived in a world of dangers". The Guardian notes that "The Nac Mac Feegle embody the stereotypical Scotsman to great comic effect". The Nac Mac Feegle are often confused with pixies, because they refer to themselves as Pictsies.

According to their own history, the Nac Mac Feegle rebelled against the wicked rule of the (or possibly "a") Queen of the Fairies, and were therefore exiled from Fairyland. According to everyone else (including the Nac Mac Feegle themselves if they forget this story), they were kicked out for causing fights and being drunk at two in the afternoon.

The Nac Mac Feegle have an innate ability to cross dimensions, which they call "the crawstep". There appears to be no limit on what worlds they can cross into like this, including worlds that exist only in a person's imagination (although they cannot use it to travel within a world—for this, we are assured, they have "feets"). Though they do not exclusively dwell on the Discworld plane, this is where they are most commonly spotted. Or, to be more accurate, where the highest concentration of their victims exist. As the Big Man of the Chalk Hill Gang, Rob Anybody, proudly states: "We've been robbin' an' runnin' aroound on all kinds o' worrlds for a lang time." The Nac Mac Feegle take pride in being able to get into, or out of, anywhere (although getting out of pubs presents something of a difficulty). In A Hat Full of Sky, they claim "the crawstep" is "all in the ankle, ye ken". Those who have actually witnessed "the crawstep" report that the Mac Feegles simply stick one leg straight out in front of them, wiggle their foot, and are suddenly gone.

The Ramtops have many legends about the Nac Mac Feegle. One, similar to the legend of Wayland's Smithy, says that if you leave sixpence and an unshod horse at a certain Feegle cairn overnight, then in the morning the coin will be gone, and you will never see your horse again either. Another says that if you leave a saucer of milk out for the pictsies, they will break into your house and take everything in the drinks cabinet.

Despite their usual policy of non-contact with bigjobs (humans), Feegles have been known to hire out their services. One of the buzzards, Morag, owned by Officer Buggy Swires of the Ankh Morpork City Watch was trained by the Feegles, for the price of several crates of strong liquor.

Among very few other things, they have the rare ability to scare Nanny Ogg's cat Greebo.

== Social structure ==
Nac Mac Feegles possess a eusocial culture similar to bees, termites and other social insects. The clan is made up of hundreds of brothers, and one mother, called a kelda. When a Clan's kelda dies, another is imported from a different clan. The new kelda chooses her husband, known as the Big Man, from among her adopted Clan when she arrives, and soon begins the lifelong task of begetting the next generation, often up to one hundred tiny baby Feegles at a time.

Depending on how long the kelda has been kelda, the majority of the tribe will either be her brothers-in-law (i.e., the sons of the previous kelda) or her sons. Daughters are very rare and, on coming of age, leave to become kelda of another tribe, taking some brothers, probably including a gonnagle (see below) with her. Young keldas are slim, but older keldas are virtually spherical. They also enjoy the odd nip of Special Sheep Liniment (which on no account should ever be given to sheep).

Essentially, the role of the kelda is to do the thinking. The Big Man is responsible for commanding his fellow Feegles and trying to maintain some semblance of order, but in truth the kelda decides what will be done and the Big Man works out the fine (for a Feegle's plans) details—although no Big Man shown so far would go on a serious expedition and not bring along the clan gonnagle, (who tend to be much brighter than the other male Feegles and have a fund of lore, stories, and ideas they can draw upon.)

Male Feegles are in dread of losing their kelda because there will be no one 'tae take care o' us'. To help her with this, she is given, before leaving her birth clan, a bottle of water from her mother's leather cauldron—which, of course, contains some of the water from her mother's cauldron, and so on. Theoretically, (and on the Discworld theories of this nature tend to work, even if they are not actually right, owing to narrative causality), the bottle contains water from the cauldrons of Nac Mac Feegle keldas since before history.

By mixing a little of the water into her own cauldron, and drinking the result, the kelda can connect with the memories of those who have gone before her—and, more mysteriously, with those who are yet to come. (Compare with Reverend Mothers from Dune universe.)

The males of the clan do not question this, accepting that keldaring is full of secrets (hiddlins) they are not expected to understand. They are warriors, hunters and foragers; Nac Mac Feegle foraging consists of taking anything that is not nailed down (if it is nailed down, they will prise it loose and take the nails as well), up to and including quite large cows if enough foragers can be gathered to do the lifting. If one were to see a sheep rise off the ground six inches and move backward rapidly, four Feegles are sure to be responsible. As Nanny Ogg testifies: "Four; one under each hoof, I seen em do it. You see a cow standin' in a field, mindin' its own business, next minute the grass is rustlin'. Some little bugger shouts "Hup, hup, hup!" and the poor beast goes by, voom!, without its legs movin'; backwards, sometimes. They're stronger than cockroaches. You step on a pictsie, you best be wearin' thick soles."

Fighting is likewise a group effort of the clan. When encountering a foe much larger than themselves, (which is most anything the Nac Mac Feegle pick a fight with,) the clan will stack themselves up like a pyramid, until the top one is high enough to punch the enemy or, preferably, head-butt them. Once an enemy is brought to the ground, the entire clan will spring into action, attacking the foe as a single, united force. As stated in The Folklore of Discworld, "once they go down, it's all over bar the kicking."

=== The Clan Gonnagle ===
Among the warriors of each clan is a gonnagle; a bard or war-poet, whose job is to create terrible poetry that is recited during battles to demoralise the enemy, (see William McGonagall.) A well-trained gonnagle can even make the enemy's ears explode and is equipped with "mousepipes" (bagpipes made from mouseskin, often with the ears still attached.) In A Hat Full of Sky, the gonnagle, Awf'lly Wee Billy Bigchin, can play the mousepipes so sadly that it will start to rain outside. A gonnagle tends to be somewhat more intelligent and level-headed than most other male Feegles, and often acts as an advisor to the Big Man. Some of them travel from clan to clan, making sure the old songs and stories are still remembered and sharing the new ones.

== Culture and beliefs ==
Despite their criminal tendencies, the Nac Mac Feegle do possess a sense of honour. They see no sport in fighting the weak. They may take one cow from a man with a herd of fifty; however, they will not steal an old woman's only pig, or an old man's only pair of false teeth. They claim it was a difference of opinion over when to stop stealing that led to their exile by the Queen of the Fairies. As a rule, the Nac Mac Feegle will never steal from the truly poor.

The Nac Mac Feegle clans that have appeared in the books are the Long Lake Clan, who settled in Lancre in Carpe Jugulum (but were not named until A Hat Full of Sky) and the Chalk Hill Clan who feature in the Tiffany Aching books. The Chalk Hill Clan had, until the arrival of their new kelda Jeannie from Long Lake, a superstition that anything written down could be used against you in a court of law, and each of them carried swords that glowed blue in the presence of lawyers. The Long Lake Clan have similar superstitions about writing and lawyers, but believe it's possible to beat them at their own game and are famed for their "verra com-plic-at-ed documents".

Nac Mac Feegle clans tend to occupy ancient burial mounds. They avoid humans if at all possible, as they are worried this might lead to folklorists and archaeologists invading their privacy and writing things down. Since they can move approximately ten times faster than a human, they find it easy to go unseen when they wish to do so.

The Nac Mac Feegle males treat witches with a nervous mix of fear and respect. All witches, regardless of age, are called "hags". A very important witch, such as Mistress Weatherwax, is acknowledged as the "hag o' hags". Feegles seem to know enough about witches to spot and respect a good one, and just as they accept that their keldas know things they do not, they are willing to believe that "the haggin'" has its own secrets. They comically fear witches who know about them, with large amounts of dread being reserved for "the Foldin' o' the Arms", "the Pursin' o' the Lips", and the "Tappin' o' the Feets", followed by "the Explainin". One witch nearly panics them when she harangues them in their own dialect, which they called "the knowin' o' the speakin".

The fearlessness of Nac Mac Feegle warriors in combat is derived from their religious belief that they cannot be killed, because they are already dead; they believe that they are in the afterlife, and that any Feegle who is killed has simply been reincarnated into the world where they have already lived before. They reason that Discworld, with the sunshine, flowers, birds, trees, things to steal and people to fight, must be some sort of heaven, because "a world that good couldn't be open to just anybody". They consider it a kind of Valhalla, where brave warriors go when they are dead. So, they reason, they have already been alive somewhere else, and then died and were allowed to come to the Discworld because they have been so good.

Thus, they do not mourn the loss of Mac Feegles who have died in battle on the Discworld, according to The Wee Free Men: "Oh, they've gone back to the land o' the livin'. It's nae as good as this one, but they'll bide fine and come back before too long. No sense in grievin'." Indeed, any grieving a Feegle might do over fallen family members is never about their actual death, but rather over the fact that he did not get to spend more time with them before they rejoined the land of the living.

Despite carrying swords that are nearly as large as they themselves (which is not outlandish, given the already-documented history of Mac Feegle feats of strength), their preferred weapons are the boot and the head; this results in most Feegles' noses being broken.

=== Language ===
The Nac Mac Feegle language is a mix of Morporkian (English), the Glaswegian dialect ("Crivens! Whut aboot us, ye daftie") and elements of Irish and Scottish Gaelic, for example Tir-far-thóinn and geas. The kelda in Wee Free Men states that "in our tongue you'd be Tir-far-thóinn" (an alternative name for Tír na nÓg), suggesting that in private their speech may be closer to Irish or Scottish Gaelic. This is also hinted at in Wintersmith, where Nanny Ogg's Place is given as Tir Nani Ogg, exhibiting Goidelic-type head-initial compounding. They also use the Yan Tan Tethera in counting occasionally.

In Carpe Jugulum, their speech is almost undecipherable and has to be translated by Nanny Ogg; however, by the time they meet Tiffany Aching, they are somewhat more understandable to "bigjobs". In reality, since the books featuring the Nac Mac Feegle are targeted at young adults, "the simpler language of a children's book accounts for the readability of the Nac Mac Feegle's speech in the Tiffany Aching books".

Nac Mac Feegle tend to have human names, usually abbreviated and with some sort of modifier (Rob Anybody, Daft Wullie, Big Aggie, Wee Jock), though their respect for inheriting and repeating famous names limits them a bit (No'-as-big-as-Medium-Sized-Jock-but-bigger-than-Wee-Jock-Jock).

== Known Feegles ==
- Big Aggie: The kelda of the Long Lake clan in Carpe Jugulum.
- Rob Anybody: The Big Man of the Chalk clan. Married to Jeannie. Faced his greatest fear and learned to read (after a fashion) at the insistence of his wife, and is determined to see his sons better at it than he is. Once attacked Death by headbutting him, to Death's annoyance (Death picked Rob out of his hood and asked Tiffany Is this yours?).
- Jeannie: The current kelda of the Chalk clan, originally from the Long Lake clan. Married to Rob Anybody. Mixed feelings about Tiffany Aching.
- Fion: Ill-tempered only female of the Chalk clan. Now a kelda of another clan.
- Daft Wullie: Not too bright, but a good feegle and champion stealer nonetheless. Only ever said the Right Thing once in his lifetime, before having said just the wrong thing on many occasions. Has an affectionate relationship with Horace the Cheese, adopting him as a kind of pet.
- Big Yan: Mighty warrior of the Chalk clan who, at a height of 7 inches, is notably taller than most of the other Feegles. Less trusting than the rest, too. Suspicious of everybody. Name possibly a reference to Billy Connolly. In The Art of Discworld, cover artist Paul Kidby acknowledged Connolly as the inspiration for Yan's look.
- Awfully Wee Billy Bigchin: He came with Jeannie from the Long Lake clan and is the new gonnagle for Chalk clan. He is notably smaller than many of the other Feegles, partly because he's just young and partly because he's just short. When Miss Level remarks how short he is in A Hat Full of Sky, he replies, "Only fra my height, Mistress."
- Hamish: a Feegle that flies on the back of a buzzard named Morag with a pair of Tiffany Aching's underwear as a parachute.
- William the Gonnagle: Gonnagle in Wee Free Men before his retirement.
- No'-As-Big-As-Medium-Sized-Jock-But-Bigger-than-Wee-Jock Jock: Gonnagle-in-training of the Chalk clan for a time, before following Fion to her new clan.
- Wee Dangerous Spike: A young and inexperienced Feegle who goes to the Underworld for the first time in Wintersmith.
- Wee Mad Arthur: First seen in Feet of Clay, where he becomes a watchman, and originally described as a gnome, however, it was revealed in I Shall Wear Midnight that he is a Feegle, that was raised by gnomes who found him after he'd been snatched by sparrowhawk and were very happy to let him stay "What with being able to bite foxes to death and everything".
- Horace the Cheese: A large, ambulatory Lancre Blue cheese, made by Tiffany. An accomplished thief and troublemaker in his own right, Horace was made a member of the Chalk Clan in Wintersmith and now sports their tartan. At one point, he attempts to sing Row, Row, Row Your Boat along with the Feegles, but, being a cheese, all he can manage to sing is, "Mnamnamnam".
- The Toad: A talking, intelligent toad, onetime witch's familiar and former lawyer (he achieved his present state after taking a case against a particularly unforgiving fairy godmother), who has taken up residence in the Clan's barrow and gives advice on legal and other civilised matters in exchange for shelter, flies and beetles.

== Gnomes ==
Besides the Nac Mac Feegle, the Disc is home to a range of small creatures called gnomes. Ranging in size from six inches to two feet, they are, Pratchett says, more or less interchangeable with the Feegles. A gnome is a pictsie living underground, while a pictsie is a gnome fighting. Despite this, there remains some ambiguity as to whether the more general gnomes, such as Buggy Swires, should be considered of the same race. Gnomes and the Nac Mac Feegle share a lot of the same characteristics, such as immense strength, bellicose personality and the use of tamed birds as lookouts. However, they are also described by Wee Mad Arthur as "making and repairing shoes for hundreds of years" similar to several children's stories. In the Discworld Companion, Pratchett describes Wee Mad Arthur, an Ankh Morpork gnome, as an urbanised Nac Mac Feegle, (however, he is later revealed to be a Feegle (see above)) and Paul Kidby's illustration of Buggy Swires in The Art of Discworld is indistinguishable from the pictsies on the cover of The Wee Free Men. However, as yet no gnome has shown evidence of the Nac Mac Feegle's fairy abilities like the crawstep (the ability to cross into dreams and parallel dimensions), or of their bee-like social structure.

Rincewind and Twoflower meet a gnome in The Light Fantastic. Twoflower is disappointed, believing he should be dressed in brightly coloured clothes and "more sort of... jolly". Rincewind explains: "He's six inches high and lives in a mushroom, of course he's a bloody gnome."

Gnomes are able to make a good living as rat-catchers, because as well as being able to chase the rats into spaces where humans cannot, they can make several good meals, and indeed warm clothes, from a rat. Gnomes also tend to be surprisingly strong for their height, described as "the strength of a man compressed into a body six inches tall".

Gnomes are also featured in the short story Theatre of Cruelty, in which a children's entertainer forces them to perform as a Punch and Judy show. This story also reveals the existence of gnomes dogs and alligators.

== Response ==
The Nac Mac Feegle have inspired a number of critical observations. Eileen Donaldson, writing in The Gothic Fairy Tale in Young Adult Literature: Essays on Stories from Grimm to Gaiman, notes that Pratchett "satirizes our expectation of fairy-folk (wings, flowers, and "tinklyness") through the Feegles who curse, drink, fight, steal, cause chaos and are feared by everyone". Lawrence Watt-Evans notes that one's "first impression is that they're a cross between Smurfs and soccer hooligans". Stephen Briggs' audiobook rendering of the Nac Mac Feegle has been cited as a strong point of his work.

== See also ==
- Aos Sí
- Leprechaun
- Tuatha Dé Danann
