= Sweet Polly Oliver =

Traditional English ballad

"Sweet Polly Oliver" is an English broadside ballad (Roud #367), traceable from 1840 or earlier. It is also known as "Pretty Polly Oliver" and has several variant sets of lyrics, set to a single anonymous melody.

It is one of the best known of a number of folk songs describing women disguising themselves as men to join the army to be with their lovers.

Thomas Root wrote a symphonic band arrangement and Benjamin Britten wrote an arrangement for voice and piano.

== Lyrics ==
As sweet Polly Oliver lay musing in bed,
A sudden strange fancy came into her head.
"Nor father nor mother shall make me false prove,
I'll 'list as a soldier, and follow my love."

So early next morning she softly arose,
And dressed herself up in her dead brother's clothes.
She cut her hair close, and she stained her face brown,
And went for a soldier to fair London Town.

Then up spoke the sergeant one day at his drill,
"Now who's good for nursing? A captain, he's ill."
"I'm ready," said Polly. To nurse him she's gone,
And finds it's her true love all wasted and wan.

The first week the doctor kept shaking his head,
"No nursing, young fellow, can save him," he said.
But when Polly Oliver had nursed him back to life
He cried, "You have cherished him as if you were his wife".

O then Polly Oliver, she burst into tears
And told the good doctor her hopes and her fears,
And very shortly after, for better or for worse,
The captain took joyfully his pretty soldier nurse.

== In popular culture ==
The main theme of Terry Pratchett’s book, Monstrous Regiment, in which a young woman named Polly, who has heard the song sung in her father's inn, joins the army to look for her missing brother. Disguised as a man and taking the name Oliver, she is under no illusions that her quest will be as trouble free as the song makes out.
