= Monstrous Regiment (novel) =

2003 Discworld novel by Terry Pratchett

- First UK edition
- Author: Terry Pratchett
- Cover artist: Paul Kidby
- Language: English
- Series: Discworld; 31st novel – 6th individual story
- Subject: Folk song (especially "Sweet Polly Oliver"), Joan of Arc, Milunka Savić, crossdressing during wartime, the Napoleonic Wars, World War I, Feminism, Characters: Polly Perks, Corporal Strappi, Lt. Blouse, Sgt. Jackrum, Igorina, Sam Vimes
- Genre: Fantasy
- Set in: Borogravia, Discworld
- Publisher: Doubleday
- Publication date: 2003
- ISBN: 0-385-60340-1
- Preceded by: The Wee Free Men
- Followed by: A Hat Full of Sky

Monstrous Regiment is an action/adventure fantasy novel by British writer Terry Pratchett, the 31st novel in his Discworld series. It takes its name from a 16th-century tract by John Knox opposing female rule, titled The First Blast of the Trumpet Against the Monstruous Regiment of Women.

The cover illustration of the British edition, by Paul Kidby, is a parody of Joe Rosenthal's photograph Raising the Flag on Iwo Jima. Monstrous Regiment was nominated for a Locus Award in 2004.

== Plot summary ==
The small, belligerent country of Borogravia is a highly conservative nation, whose people live according to the increasingly strange decrees of its deity, Nuggan. The main feature of his religion is the Abominations, a long, often-updated list of banned things. These things include garlic, cats, the smell of beets, people with ginger hair, shirts with six buttons, anyone shorter than three feet (namely dwarves, children, and babies), sneezing, jigsaw puzzles, chocolate (which was once Borogravia's staple export, plunging the country into increasing poverty), crop rotation (which degraded Borogravia's soil and reduced already scarce food supplies), and the colour blue.

Borogravia is in the midst of a war against an alliance of neighbouring countries, caused by a border dispute with the country of Zlobenia. Prince Heinrich of Zlobenia claims to be heir to the Borogravian throne through his aunt, the long-unseen Duchess. Ankh-Morpork has become involved following the destruction of its Clacks (optical telegraph) towers by Borogravia. Borogravia's leadership denies rumours that the war is going poorly for them.

Polly Perks's brother Paul, a gentle young man who loves birds and art, is missing in action after being conscripted. Polly is unable to take over the family business (a tavern known as "The Duchess"), as Nugganitic law does not permit women to own property. If Paul does not return, the pub will be lost to their drunken cousin when their father dies. Partly to ensure her own future but mainly to ascertain whether Paul is alive, Polly sets off to join the army in order to find him. Women joining the army are regarded as an Abomination Unto Nuggan, so Polly dresses up as a man and enlists as Private Oliver Perks (taking her name from the folk song "Sweet Polly Oliver").

Polly is recruited into a squad led by the gruff but kind, long-serving Sergeant Jackrum and the repulsive political officer Corporal Strappi. Her fellow recruits include humans "Tonker" Halter, "Shufti" Manickle, "Wazzer" Goom, and "Lofty" Tewt, but due to the shortage of humans, also a vampire named Maladict, a troll named Carborundum, and an Igor named Igor.

That night, while answering a call of nature, Polly meets an unseen supporter who assures her that although they know that Polly is a girl, they won't give her away. They give her some hints on how to pass as a boy more convincingly. Over the next few days, Polly discovers Lofty is also a girl. Since Lofty and Tonker are always together, Polly assumes that Lofty joined the army to follow her man. Later, she finds out that Shufti is also a girl and pregnant; she joined the army to find the boy who impregnated her. Gradually, Polly discovers not only that most soldiers in the regiment are female but also receives confirmation of Borogravia's bleak situation. Most of her country's forces are captured or on the run, and food supplies are limited.

The regiment meets its officer, the inexperienced Lieutenant Blouse, and makes its way toward the border Keep which the Zlobenians and their allies have captured. Thanks to a chance encounter where the regiment subdue and humiliate an elite Zlobenian detachment, including an undercover Prince Heinrich, their exploits become known to the outside world through William de Worde and his newspaper, The Ankh-Morpork Times. Their progress particularly piques the interest of Commander Vimes, who is stationed as a special envoy with the alliance at the Keep. Vimes has his officers keep track of the regiment, occasionally secretly providing aid.

Polly and most of the regiment are able to infiltrate the Keep, disguised as washerwomen. Once inside, they release the Borogravian prisoners of war. Borogravia is able to retake much of the Keep, but when Polly admits her regiment are women, their own forces arrest them and bring them in front of a council of senior officers. With the council about to discharge them and force them to return home, Jackrum barges in and intervenes, revealing that more than a third of the military's top officers (including Chief of the General Staff General Froc) are women as well.

In the midst of this revelation, the Duchess, who has become an actual deity by the Borogravians' faith, briefly possesses Wazzer, her most passionate believer. The Duchess urges all of the generals to quit the war and return home to repair their country, ending their obligation to her, and promotes Jackrum to Sergeant-Major. It is revealed that Nuggan is now dead, being reduced to a whisper, with the new Abominations (the last being rocks, ears, and accordion players) being produced by the collective anxiety of his 'worshippers.'

A truce is successfully negotiated, and military rules are changed so that women are allowed to serve openly. In a private moment with Jackrum, Polly reveals to the Sergeant that she knows he is also a woman and persuades Jackrum to retire and find his grown son William, reuniting with him as his long-lost "father". Maladict admits that her real name is Maladicta, confirming that the entire regiment except Blouse and Strappi had been women all along.

Shufti finds her baby's father but rejects him after realising he only wanted to marry her for money. The Morporkians release Polly's brother Paul alive and well, and they return home to The Duchess tavern, accompanied by Shufti. The other members of the regiment go on to live lives that they would not have been able to consider before their emancipation.

Some time later, despite the peace they had desperately fought for, conflict breaks out again. Polly, having received correspondence from Jackrum, leaves the tavern to seek new ways to fight a war using the influence she gained. On the way to the front, she reunites with Maladicta and identifies two new enlistees as girls impersonating boys and takes them under her leadership.

== Characters ==
Borogravians

- Grand Duchess Annagovia
- General Mildred Froc
- Major Christine Clogston, a Provost (military police) who defends the regiment during their hearing
- Lieutenant Daphne Blouse (of the Tenth Infantry)
- Private Lart Hubukurk the younger
- Private Joe Hubukurk the elder (retired)
- Sergeant-Major Jack Jackrum
- Corporal Strappi
- Polly "Ozzer" Perks
- Igor(ina)
- Maladict(a)
- Jade "Carborundum"
- "Tonker" Halter
- Betty "Shufti" Manickle
- Alice "Wazzer" Goom
- Tilda "Lofty" Tewt
- Enid, head of the Keep's laundry

Zlobenians and other neighboring countries

- Prince Heinrich

Ankh-Morporkians

- Samuel Vimes (Duke and Commander of the Ankh-Morpork City Watch)
- Sergeant Angua von Überwald, a werewolf
- Corporal Buggy Swires, a gnome
- Constable Reg Shoe, a zombie
- Clarence Chinny (Consul to Zlobenia)
- William de Worde (of the Ankh-Morpork Times)
- Otto Chriek (of the Ankh-Morpork Times)
- Lord Ronald Rust, commander of the Ankh-Morpork forces in the alliance

== Reception ==
The New York Times felt that Monstrous Regiment "had serious heft", comparing Pratchett's depiction of "the pity of war" to Wilfred Owen. The Chicago Reader, addressing the 2014 stage adaptation, considered it to be largely "a satire on the flimsiness of traditional gender roles", while Publishers Weekly noted its "astute comments on power, religious intolerance and sexual stereotyping".

At Boing Boing, Cory Doctorow lauded Pratchett's "capacity for marvellous bathos", "epic" characterization, and "drum-tight" plotting, commending the "sprightliness" with which the novel's philosophical themes are integrated into the text. PopMatters felt that the book lacked subtlety, but was "more than one-dimensional", commending Pratchett for "manag[ing] to walk right on the edge of proselytizing without ever quite crossing over" and for showing that there is no "clear-cut solution" to the issues which led to the Borogravian conflict. BuzzFeed, however, was far more negative, calling it "clunky", and ranking it last among the adult-oriented Discworld novels published prior to the announcement of Pratchett's diagnosis with Alzheimer's disease.

Reading order guide
Preceded by The Wee Free Men	31st Discworld Novel	Succeeded by A Hat Full of Sky
Preceded by The Amazing Maurice and his Educated Rodents	7th Individual Story; Published in 2003	Succeeded by A Collegiate Casting-Out of Devilish Devices
