= I Shall Wear Midnight =

2010 Discworld novel by Terry Pratchett

- First edition
- Author: Terry Pratchett
- Cover artist: Paul Kidby
- Language: English
- Series: Discworld; 38th Novel - 4th Tiffany Aching story
- Subject: Characters: Tiffany Aching, Nac Mac Feegle, Granny Weatherwax, Nanny Ogg, Carrot Ironfoundersson, Sergeant Angua, Wee Mad Arthur; Locations: The Chalk, Ankh-Morpork
- Genre: Fantasy
- Publisher: Doubleday
- Publication date: 2 September 2010
- ISBN: 0385611072
- Preceded by: Unseen Academicals
- Followed by: Snuff

I Shall Wear Midnight is a comic fantasy novel by English writer Terry Pratchett, set on the Discworld. It is the fourth novel within the Discworld series to be based on the character of Tiffany Aching. It was published on 2 September 2010 in the United Kingdom, and on 28 September in the United States, and won the 2010 Andre Norton Award.

It centres on Tiffany Aching, who is now fifteen years old and getting on with the hard work of being a witch. The title is taken from a quotation in A Hat Full of Sky: "When I'm old I shall wear midnight, she'd decided. But for now she'd had enough of darkness."

In an interview at the Guardian Book Club, Pratchett remarked that the book is an urban fantasy.

== Plot ==
Tiffany is working as the Chalk's only witch in a climate of growing suspicion and prejudice. When the local Baron (for whom she had been caring) dies of poor health, she is accused of murder. Tiffany travels to Ankh-Morpork to inform the Baron's heir, Roland, who happens to be in the city with his fiancée Letitia. On the way Tiffany is attacked by the Cunning Man, a frightening figure who has holes where his eyes should be.

In the city she meets Mrs Proust, the proprietor of Boffo's joke shop, where many witches buy their stereotypical witch accoutrements. When they find Roland and Letitia the Nac Mac Feegles, who have as usual been following Tiffany, are accused of destroying a pub. Tiffany and Mrs. Proust are arrested by Carrot and Angua, and (nominally) locked up – although it is mostly, in fact, for their protection as people start to resent witches.

When they are released the next day, Tiffany meets Eskarina Smith (not seen since the events of the third Discworld novel, Equal Rites), who explains to her that the Cunning Man was, a thousand years ago, an Omnian witch-finder, who had fallen in love with a witch. That witch, however, knew how evil the Cunning Man was. She was eventually burnt to death, but as she was being burned she trapped the Cunning Man in the fire as well. The Cunning Man became a demonic spirit of pure hatred, able to corrupt other minds with suspicion and hate. Eskarina announces that the Cunning Man is coming. Tiffany and the Feegles return to the Chalk, where they find the Baron's soldiers trying to dig up the Feegle mound. She stops them, and goes to see Roland, who throws her in a dungeon (which she locks on the inside, and where she is brought bacon, eggs, and coffee in the morning). It is later learned that the Cunning Man was responsible for these actions.

Tiffany escapes, however, and goes to see Letitia, who she discovers is also an untrained but talented witch. She sees the Cunning Man twice while at Letitia's home, and as guests begin to arrive at Roland and Letitia's wedding, the other witches start to arrive, so that if the Cunning Man takes over her body, they can kill her. The night before the wedding, Tiffany, Roland, Letitia and Preston (a castle guard whom Tiffany has befriended) meet at one of the fields that needs to be burned to clear it of stubble; Tiffany lures the Cunning Man into the flames and defeats him.

After some discussions, the story then jumps forward a year where she is offered a beautiful black dress by Amber. Preston, who is about as smart as Tiffany, shows his love for her, which Tiffany reciprocates.

== Characters ==
- Tiffany Aching
- The Cunning Man
- Jeannie
- Letitia Keepsake
- Nac Mac Feegle
- Deirdre Parsley, lately Lady Keepsake / The Duchess
- Amber Petty
- Preston
- Roland
- Eskarina Smith

Reading order guide
Preceded by Unseen Academicals	38th Discworld Novel	Succeeded by Snuff
Preceded by Wintersmith	4th Tiffany Aching Story	Succeeded by The Shepherd's Crown
