= Overlord (video game series) =

Action role-playing video game series by Codemasters

- Genre: Action role-playing
- Developers: Triumph Studios; Overlord; Overlord: Raising Hell; Overlord II; Climax Action; Overlord: Dark Legend; Overlord: Minions; Codemasters; Overlord: Fellowship of Evil
- Publisher: Codemasters
- Platforms: Linux; macOS; Microsoft Windows; Nintendo DS; PlayStation 3; PlayStation 4; Wii; Xbox 360; Xbox One
- First release: Overlord; 26 June 2007
- Latest release: Overlord: Fellowship of Evil; 20 October 2015

Overlord is an action role-playing video game series published by Codemasters and originally developed by Triumph Studios. The franchise was introduced in 2007 and has received six video games to date. The latest game is Overlord: Fellowship of Evil, developed by Codemasters.

== Games ==
Release timeline
2007	Overlord
2008	Overlord: Raising Hell
2009	Overlord II
2009	Overlord: Dark Legend
2009	Overlord: Minions
2010
2011
2012
2013
2014
2015	Overlord: Fellowship of Evil

Aggregate review scores As of 18 May 2020.
Game	Year	Metacritic
Overlord	2007	PC: 81/100; X360: 76/100
Overlord: Raising Hell	2008	PS3: 72/100
Overlord II	2009	PC: 79/100; PS3: 72/100; X360: 75/100
Overlord: Dark Legend	2009	Wii: 68/100
Overlord: Minions	2009	DS: 58/100
Overlord: Fellowship of Evil	2015	PC: 24/100; PS4: 36/100; XONE: 33/100

=== Overlord (2007) ===
The first video game of the franchise was announced in 2006 after the development stretching a year and a half. It was developed by Triumph Studios and published by Codemasters. The game was initially released for Xbox 360, Microsoft Windows, Linux and PlayStation 3 on 26 June 2007.

=== Overlord: Raising Hell (2008) ===
An expanded version of the original work, titled Overlord: Raising Hell, was initially available for Microsoft Windows and Xbox 360 on 15 February 2008. A PlayStation 3 version was later ported by 4J Studios and first released on 24 June 2008.

=== Overlord II (2009) ===
Overlord II is the sequel to the 2007 video game Overlord. It was still developed by Triumph Studios and published by Codemasters. It was available on Linux, Microsoft Windows, PlayStation 3 and Xbox 360 platforms.

=== Overlord: Dark Legend (2009) ===
A spin-off series to Overlord II, titled Overlord: Dark Legend, was released on Wii. It was developed by Climax Action and initially available on 23 June 2009.

=== Overlord: Minions (2009) ===
Another spin-off series to Overlord II, titled Overlord: Minions, was released on Nintendo DS. It was developed by Climax Action and initially available on 23 June 2009.

=== Overlord: Fellowship of Evil (2015) ===
The sixth video game of franchise and a third spin-off, titled Overlord: Fellowship of Evil, was developed and published by Codemasters for Microsoft Windows, PlayStation 4 and Xbox One. It was scheduled to be released on 29 September 2015 worldwide, but was postponed to 20 October.
