= Overlord (2007 video game) =

2007 action role-playing video game

- PAL box art
- Developer: Triumph Studios
- Publisher: Codemasters
- Director: Lennart Sas
- Designer: Lennart Sas
- Writer: Rhianna Pratchett
- Composers: Michiel van den Bos; Mark Knight
- Series: Overlord
- Platforms: Windows, Xbox 360, PlayStation 3, Linux, OS X
- Release: Windows, Xbox 360: NA: 26 June 2007; EU: 29 June 2007; AU: 6 July 2007; PlayStation 3 (as Raising Hell): EU: 20 June 2008; NA: 24 June 2008; AU: 26 June 2008; Linux, OS X 21 July 2016
- Genre: Action role-playing
- Modes: Single-player, multiplayer

Overlord is an action role-playing video game developed by Triumph Studios and published by Codemasters for Xbox 360, Microsoft Windows, Linux and PlayStation 3. It was released in 2007 in North America on 26 June, in Europe on 29 June and Australia on 6 July.

Development on the game began in early 2006 and the game was announced in May of the same year, with gameplay demonstrated at E3 2006. After over a year and a half of development, its release in 2007 was met with generally favourable reviews, and helped boost overall sales for Codemasters that year. An expansion pack entitled Overlord: Raising Hell was released in late 2007 (Germany only) and February 2008 (worldwide), along with additional multiplayer maps and a local split-screen co-op mode. Raising Hell was also released for the PlayStation 3 in June 2008, bundled with the original game. A sequel, Overlord II, was released in June 2009, followed by a spinoff for the Wii, entitled Overlord: Dark Legend, and a Nintendo DS game called Overlord: Minions.

Overlord is set in a fantasy world, where the player takes the role of a resurrected warrior known as "The Overlord" who has control over hordes of gremlin-like creatures known as "Minions". The player must defeat seven corrupt ruling heroes in order to reconquer the lands and establish his lordship over its inhabitants. The game features a corruption feature, similar to that of the Fable games, but allowing the player to "be evil… or really evil", where certain actions and choices affect different aspects of the story and gameplay. While the Overlord is controlled in a third person perspective, the way minions are controlled brings elements of real-time strategy and upgrades bring those of role-playing games. The game uses dark humour, and is a satirical parody of the traditional fantasy setting and plot. The story was written by Rhianna Pratchett.

== Gameplay ==
The game centers on simultaneously controlling the Overlord and an army of goblin-like minions to traverse the 3D gameworld and defeat the seven heroes who slew the Overlord's predecessor, and who have since been corrupted by power. Each one represents one of the seven deadly sins.

The player uses the minions for the majority of tasks such as combat.

There are four minion races, each of which have their own colour and abilities:

- Browns are melee fighters
- Blues can revive defeated minions and swim
- Reds throw fireballs at enemies, can put out fires and are immune to fire attacks,
- Greens backstab enemies and can clear poisonous gas and plants.

Minions are summoned from the spawning pits found scattered throughout the game. The player needs to pay life-force, which can be gained by killing creatures, like large bugs, to summon minions. At the start of the game only five minions can be summoned at once; as the game progresses this can increase to a maximum of fifty. In addition to controlling minions, the player can sacrifice them at altars of blood and magic to restore the Overlord's health or mana. Once a forge is acquired, they can be used to imbue weapons and armor to increase the Overlord's abilities.

The player begins in an old ruined tower that has been plundered of its magical artifacts and acts as a central hub for the player. As the stolen tower objects are recovered, new rooms and spells become available for use, and the Overlord's maximum health and mana increase. The player also needs to recover the blue, green, and red minion hives to summon the respective minions. The player can customize the tower with a variety of visual items such as banners and statues; the available visual items differ depending on in-game actions. Armour and weapons can be purchased or improved in the forge. Most defeated enemy types appear as opponents in the dungeon, an arena where the Overlord can fight them again (excluding bosses such as heroes and one-of-a-kind beasts).

While the game claims that the Overlord is evil, the quests show him being more of an anti-hero. It tracks how corrupt the Overlord is in accomplishing his goals. During the game the Overlord is tempted by each of the deadly sins while trying to kill their corresponding heroes. The player's choices will influence your corruption level, either raising or lowering it. Slaughtering inoffensive townsfolk, stealing gold and other activities can increase the corruption level. The corruption level changes the way townsfolk treat the Overlord and will also change his appearance, a system similar to Fable. As corruption increases, the Overlord's armour will become more devilish with horns protruding out of the back, shoulders, elbows and knees and he will acquire a black aura. The corruption level determines which game ending the player sees and which high-level spells they can cast.

The game offers several multiplayer modes, Slaughter, Survival, and Pillage. Slaughter pits two Overlords against each other in a head-to-head combat with potentially hundreds of minions. In Survival, two Overlords team up against large armies of enemies. Pillage is a competition in which two Overlords and their minions compete to see who can pillage and plunder the most gold in a selected amount of time. The Xbox 360 version provides voice chat over Xbox Live. In the PlayStation 3 version of Raising Hell, the game features a mini-map on screen to help the player navigate through the game's world.

== Synopsis ==
=== Characters ===
Gnarl (left), The Jester (middle) and The Overlord (right)

The player takes the role of the Overlord, the game's silent protagonist/anti-hero, whose motivations and personality are left for the player to determine. At the outset of the game, tiny gremlin-like minions pry open his coffin and revive him. In rapid succession, his minions shove him into armour, name him successor to the previous Overlord, and task him with slaying his predecessor's murderers, the Seven Heroes. In the intervening years, the Seven Heroes each fell prey to one of the Seven Deadly Sins. Despite recalling nothing of his past, the Overlord begins to rebuild the tower at the suggestion of his adviser Gnarl. As the new Overlord, the protagonist holds absolute sway over his minions. Complementing this power, he possesses some proficiency using axes, swords, and maces. Through his tower, the Overlord can channel magical energies capable of wanton destruction or defence.

Although the titular Overlord is the protagonist, the game relies heavily on Gnarl, the oldest minion, to advise and guide the player. For the majority of the game, he remains by the Tower Heart relaying information and reminders since "there are evil deeds that need doing". He acts as narrator for the plot. Eventually, the Overlord's mistress comes to reside in the tower. She redecorates the rooms and upgrades the minions and the tower as well as shares opinions on certain actions. Rose is the first potential mistress rescued from bandits. Despite the Overlord's menace and actions, she is initially strong-willed, cheery and unafraid of the Overlord's minions. The other potential mistress is Rose's sister Velvet whose evil tendencies are less ambiguous than her sister's and dresses far more provocatively. She repeatedly ask for presents and lusts for the Overlord and shows a distinct lack of empathy or grief over her fiancé's murder at the hands of the Overlord.

The "seven heroes" are corrupt themselves, each with a trait representing one of the seven deadly sins:

- The Halfling leader Melvin Underbelly has become gluttonous and as a result, morbidly obese – he has taken to sending bands of armed also obese halflings to steal food from neighbouring Spree to feed his unending hunger.
- The mightiest Elven warrior of Evernight Forest, Oberon Greenhaze is in a constant sleep and his sloth has caused his nightmares to haunt the forest. His apathy allowed the dwarves to invade Evernight and kill or enslave most of the elves, but they were in turn driven out when the creatures of his nightmares became real.
- The ruler of Heaven's Peak and Velvet's fiancé, Sir William the Black shows strong lust towards unorthodox sexual interests such as having relations with a succubus, and indulges in decadent parties with a secret cult. The presence of the succubus has caused a plague of undeath in the fortified city.
- The Dwarf King Goldo Golderson of the Golden Hills has become overly greedy and desires wealth over all the other aspects of life where he has even forced the remaining elves to mine for it. His paranoia that his riches will be stolen has led him to heavily militarise the entire dwarven empire – he himself rides a war-like steam roller named "Rollie".
- Envy drives Jewel the Thieving Hero to steal anything valuable even though she cares nothing for possessions and Kahn the Warrior is very protective of her and is driven wild with wrath whenever anything appears to threaten her. Both of them command the bandits and beholders from the Ruborian Desert.
- The Previous Overlord, having possessed the body of the Wizard (who was the founder of the group of heroes), shows pride in his work, which involves deception and an urge for supreme power, and is the game's main antagonist.

=== Plot ===
The game begins after the events of Dark Legend where Gnarl and the Brown minions awaken the Overlord from his tomb. From here they suit him in his armour and proclaim him Overlord in his old and dilapidated tower – the previous Overlord having been killed by heroes, ready to reconquer the lands. The Overlord first turns to the Mellow Hills, where the Halflings and their leader Melvin Underbelly are using the townspeople of Spree and Red minions as slave labour. The Overlord storms the Halfling Homes, slaying Melvin and reclaiming the Reds and Spree (to the peasants’ delight or disgust depending on whether the Overlord returns their stolen food). Castle Spree however has come under attack by bandits. After flushing them out, the castle mistress Rose offers her service to the Overlord.

At Evernight Forest, the roots of a tree where Oberon Greenhaze sleeps cover the Elves' home, nearly extinct after being ransacked by Dwarves. The Green minions are found and Oberon is slain. The Elves' sacred statue, however, has been stolen by the Dwarves, angering Jewel, the Thieving Hero, who wanted to steal it for herself. At Heaven's Peak the town is overrun by zombies and demons. Here the Overlord gains the Blue minions. At the town's inn, it is discovered that town leader Sir William the Black had fallen for a Succubus, calling off his wedding to Rose's sister Velvet. Killing Sir William in Angelis Keep, Velvet offers her services to the Overlord and he must choose between her and Rose.

The Overlord turns to the Dwarven Golden Hills and their leader Goldo Golderson, who has become greedy for gold. Here the remaining enslaved Elves claim the last of their women are being held in the Royal Halls of the Dwarven Keep. Meanwhile, at the Dwarf construction site, Gnarl recommends that the Overlord stash a few minions inside the Elf sacred statue and allow Jewel to take it in order to follow her to her homeland, the Ruborian Desert. Back at the Royal Halls, where Goldo is defeated, the Overlord can either take his stash of gold or free the remaining Elf women before the halls collapse. The Ruborian desert is found and Jewel is captured and interrogated. An enraged Kahn the Warrior, protective of Jewel, strikes back and the Overlord now has to save Spree and Heaven's Peak from his wrath.

Back at the tower the minions submit to the previous Overlord who has secretly possessed the Wizard, originally father to Rose and Velvet, and who lays claim to his previous title. The old Overlord tells the current one that he was originally the eighth hero who came to slay him, yet fell from a great height and was left for dead by his companions while they looted the Tower. The Old Overlord put him in the sarcophagus to heal his wounds in order to use him to defeat the other heroes. The Overlord battles the old Overlord, during which the old Overlord brags of being responsible for the corruption of the heroes. Upon the old Overlord's death, the Overlord reclaims his tower and minions.

Depending on the Overlord's corruption and choices throughout, the ending will show 4 of 8 different ending cutscenes where either the Overlord is met with bliss and praise or he pillages and scorches the land and tortures the inhabitants. Regardless of the player's unique ending, the Jester is shown performing some sort of ritual, with Gnarl narrating "Evil will always find a way".

== Development ==
Overlord was announced in May 2006 for the Xbox 360 and PC, advertised as being a next generation game set in a "twisted fantasy world where players have the choice to be evil ... or really evil!" Along with this announcement, the first screenshots and artwork were released. Early concept art showed the Overlord with a clearly visible human face as opposed to his form in the final release as a dark covered shadow with lit up eyes. At E3 2006, the majority of the game mechanics were revealed within the same month, while the multiplayer component had yet to be announced.

The Xbox 360 demo was released for download over Xbox Live on 8 June, while the PC demo was released just days later over the internet, weeks before the game's first release in North America. The demo included only the initial portion of the game, which contained the game's introductory cinematic and narration, the tutorial and the Overlord's battle to free human peasants from a Halfling operated slave camp. The full game was released simultaneously for Windows and Xbox 360 in 2007 in North America on 26 June, Europe on 29 June, and Australia on 6 July.

During post release, along with patches, by August there were already outlined plans for downloadable content for both versions. These were said to include the introduction of new multiplayer maps, offline co-op and the possibility of an extension or an additional chapter to the game's single-player plot. A patch was released for the PC version of the game, updating the software to version 1.2 and fixing a number of bugs, including one which occasionally prevented players from completing the game. The corresponding Xbox 360 update arrived several weeks later. The first downloadable content was announced in November the same year, along with news of an expansion, in the form of a "Challenge Pack", which was to add seven new maps and two modes to the multiplayer feature, an offline split screen version and a "Legendary" difficulty for single player, with corresponding Achievement Points for the 360 version. These new modes were made available in late 2007 in Germany only, and on 15 February 2008 worldwide, for the PC and Xbox Live for the 360, along with the split-screen option for free.

In July 2007, shortly after the release of Overlord there were rumours of a PlayStation 3 port, due to job advertisements at Triumph Studios, which mentioned one position needed "Porting [Xbox 360]/PC code base to [PlayStation 3]". A spokesman for Codemasters however quickly corrected this by stating "We are not porting Overlord to [PlayStation 3]." In February 2008 Codemasters confirmed a PlayStation 3 version of Overlord was in development. Instead of a straight port of the original, the version includes both the original game and its additional downloadable content and expansion on one Blu-ray Disc, under the title Overlord: Raising Hell, released in Q2 2008. The demo was made available on the PlayStation Store on 15 May 2008 and later fully released in Europe on 20 June, North America on 24 June, and in Australia on 26 June. Developed by Virtual Programming, ports for Overlord and the Raising Hell expansion were released for Linux and OS X on 21 July 2016.

=== Overlord: Raising Hell ===
On 1 November 2007, Codemasters announced Overlord: Raising Hell, a downloadable expansion pack. The premise behind this is that an Abyss appears in each of the five kingdoms (Mellow Hills, Evernight Forest, Heaven's Peak, the Golden Hills and the Ruborian Desert), causing the residents to disappear. In each of the Abysses there is a hero being tortured and an Abyss Stone. In order to obtain the Abyss Stone and gain control over the Abyss, the Overlord has to battle Wraiths, the residents of the Abysses, and the fallen heroes. Once the Overlord has control of the Abysses, he will be able to battle the one who summoned these Abysses and fight for the domination of his realm. Along with the additional multiplayer content, Raising Hell was released for the PC and Xbox Live for the Xbox 360, in late 2007 in Germany only, and worldwide on 15 February 2008.

== Reception ==
Reception

Aggregate scores
Aggregator	Score	
Aggregator	PC	Xbox 360
GameRankings	81%	77%
Metacritic	81/100	76/100

Review scores
Publication	Score	
Publication	PC	Xbox 360
1Up.com	N/A	B+
Eurogamer	N/A	8/10
Game Informer	N/A	7.5/10
GameSpot	N/A	7.5/10
GameSpy	N/A	3.5/5
IGN	8/10	6.6/10
Official Xbox Magazine (US)	N/A	8/10
PC Gamer (UK)	75/100	N/A

Before its release, at E3 2006, Overlord won GameSpot's E3 2006 Editors Choice Award of Best Surprise. Overlord gained a generally positive response from game critics with an average review score of 77% for the Xbox 360 version and 81% for the PC at GameRankings. Many praised the game for its concept, noted for being similar to that of Pikmin, which was popular for the same reason.

GameSpot noted "the satisfaction of running amok with your legion of wickedly enthusiastic minions is what makes Overlord worth playing", while Game Informer praised the game's personality, notably that of the minions, where "The satire is funny, and the evil is deliciously over-the-top, but the minions are the real stars". IGN stated similar pros, calling it "evil, yet light-hearted, humor" and that with the "richly detailed world combine for a game that is worth diving into". 1UP.com noted the personal element of controlling the minions, stating "If they (minions) die, just call up more. Something happens along the way, though: You start getting attached to the little guys".

Despite the game's premise as the choice to be "evil or really evil", numerous reviewers pointed out that some of the game's choices within missions are more good than evil; such as, for example, the option to return the peasants' stolen food stocks. While mentioning this too, Eurogamer added that, since the game humour is mainly satire, these good deeds "kind of becomes the joke. Especially early on, there's a fairly obvious irony in that everyone else in the world is assuming that you're this brave hero when in fact you're clearly a sociopath". In December 2007, Overlord was included in Eurogamer's Top 50 Games of 2007.

Other reviewers noted that the game can become frustrating at times, due to the controls not being able to keep up with the game's pace, and apparent glitches between platform and regional versions. IGN US gave the 360 version a 6.6/10 due to a game crashing bug, calling it "the equivalent of having to critique a good book only to pause three quarters of the way through and have the author rip the remaining pages out simply because you took a break at the wrong moment". IGN UK and Australia, however, did not find such a bug, giving Overlord a higher score of 8.1 and 8.0. GameSpot had a similar issue over the poor camera control in the PC version, at first rating it with a 6.0, but re-rated the game higher after reviewing a newer version. They still, however, held the shortcoming of the "controls that you'll occasionally struggle against". GameSpy noted the multiplayer mode being "sloppy" and "unstable" at times, not being as enjoyable as the single player mode, having "experienced a couple disconnects, and had more than one game end prematurely due to simple frustration".

== Sequel and spin-offs ==
Following the 2007 game's release on the PlayStation 3 in 2008 as "Raising Hell", the same year on 13 August Codemasters announced a sequel entitled Overlord II to be released for all three platforms to be released sometime in 2009. According to developers, the game "massively increases the scope of the original concept" while taking the role of a different Overlord due to the events in the story of Raising Hell, continuing where the last game finished with a new "Roman-inspired" prime foe. Control over minions will also be expanded allowing to do other tasks like "riding mounts, using war machines and sailing warships"

In the same announcement for the official sequel were plans for a spin-off for the Wii entitled Overlord: Dark Legend to feature a new Overlord although plot continuity with the main series has yet to be explained but is to establish "the idea that there have been a series of Overlords throughout time". Being developed for the Wii, it has motion controls implemented such as "plucking a minion from the horde, holding him by the neck and shaking him around" by using this feature. "Dark Legend" is a prequel set prior to the original game in the storyline.

Another spin-off entitled Overlord: Minions was released for the Nintendo DS handheld game console but with more puzzle based gameplay and only controlling the minions. Both Nintendo spin-offs were developed by Climax Studios while Triumph Studios would work on developing Overlord II. All three games were released during June 2009.

A new installment in the series, Overlord: Fellowship of Evil was announced in April 2015. The game was released on 20 October 2015, for Microsoft Windows, PlayStation 4 and Xbox One and supports co-operative multiplayer upon launch.
