= Overlord: Raising Hell =

- European cover
- Developers: Triumph Studios; 4J Studios (PlayStation 3)
- Publisher: Codemasters
- Director: Lennart Sas
- Designer: Lennart Sas
- Writer: Rhianna Pratchett
- Composer: Michiel van den Bos
- Series: Overlord
- Platforms: Microsoft Windows, PlayStation 3, Xbox 360, OS X, Linux
- Release: DE: 16 November 2007; NA: 15 February 2008; EU: 15 February 2008
- Genre: Action role-playing
- Modes: Single-player, multiplayer

Overlord: Raising Hell is the expansion to the 2007 action role-playing game Overlord, which was released for download over Xbox Live for the Xbox 360 version and online for the PC version, both in the German market on November 2007, and worldwide regions on 15 February 2008, alongside additional multiplayer add-ons. A PlayStation 3 version of Overlord was released in June 2008 including the downloadable content.

The expansion adds an extension to the game's single-player with new levels, plot, enemies and weapons.

As well as the original Overlord, the story of Raising Hell was written by Rhianna Pratchett.

== Additions ==
Early Raising Hell screenshot

Along with an extended story, Raising Hell also features new weapons and armor to be created in the forge of the Overlord's Tower. To forge the new items, first the player has to locate the mold for each item and bring it back to the tower forge, for it to be imbued with minion life force (like original weapons and armor). The new items have more noticeable effects however. For example, there are weapons that invoke fire damage, and can deal shock attacks (as opposed to simple strength power-ups). There are also helms that can double the amount of life force received after defeating enemies. The new items are not limited to the new areas, and they can be used in the original lands as well as the tower dungeon.

== Plot ==
The plot takes place right after the events in the original Overlord where Gnarl reports evil energy being emitted from the Overlord's various conquered lands. Upon his arrival in the Mellow Hills, the peasants of Spree surround a large portal, which they believe to be a passage to Heaven. Upon arriving, however, they end up in the "Abyss", an alternate hell version of their own lands where they are tortured or forced to work. In the Mellow Hills Abyss, the now fallen Halfling hero Melvin Underbelly, previously slain by the Overlord in the last game, is being punished by becoming even more gluttonous than before, constantly eating to the point of exploding, yet returning to the Abyss to restart the same process endlessly. Luring him with food, the Overlord uses Melvin's torture as a method of blowing through the Abyss's defenses. Melvin ends up rolling into a hole, there unable to eat anything but mud and earthworms. The Overlord secures the Abyss stone, which allows him to take control of the dimension.

At this point, Abyss gates have appeared over the rest of the land, allowing the Overlord to try to conquer the rest of the dimension. In the Evernight Forest Abyss, Oberon Greenhaze and the remaining Elves are being tortured by having to watch a poor-quality reenactment of their demise at the hands of the Dwarves which is used to mock their God, the Mother Goddess, and as an excuse to kill on stage. Behind the set, the Overlord finds the terror, which happens to be the Dwarf king Goldo's steam roller "Rollie". With it he finishes the production and burns Oberon to ash with Rollie's flamethrower, allowing access to another Abyss stone.

Back at Heaven's Peak, the women have left through their Abyss gate and dominate the dimension where previous Heaven's Peak ruler Sir William the Black is being constantly burnt with the rest of his cult. To appease the women, the Overlord uses Sir William to power humiliating pedal-operated devices for domestic tasks like washing the floor or cutting grass. The women are eventually returned to the normal world, and the Overlord kills Sir William off a second time when he tries to take the next Abyss stone for himself. At the Golden Hills Abyss, Goldo Golderson has been turned into a large Golden statue, encasing an Abyss stone. By luring the now demented Dwarf forces, they quickly pick away at Goldo until the Abyss stone is revealed for the Overlord to take.

With all four Abyss stones, the Overlord gains access to the Infernal Abyss gate in the Ruborian desert. Despite heavy resistance of its undead forces, the Overlord enters its main Labyrinth. After breaking through a wall constructed with the pieces of a shattered Kahn the warrior (who still cries out for Jewel), the Overlord confronts the Forgotten God for a final showdown. Apparently, the god was trying to gain access to the normal world after having been banished by the Mother Goddess after he was caught cheating on her (it is never answered as to how he managed to break into the mortal world, but there is a cutscene at the end of the first game that shows the Jester performing an evil ritual, suggesting he was the one behind this whole plan).

Upon his defeat, the Forgotten God tears down his domain and the Abyss gates, hoping to kill the Overlord. While the minions, along with the lost Jester, make it back to the normal world safely, the Overlord is stranded in the Abyss. However, the Overlord witnesses the Abyss' forces falling to their knees, as defeating their original master has made the Overlord the new God of the Abyss. Back in the normal world, Gnarl and the minions mourn their loss, and Gnarl admits that he had a soft spot for this particular Overlord and considers the possibility that he might return, ending the scene with the same quote with which he ended the previous game: "Evil will always find a way", at this point revealing that the Overlord's mistress (either Rose or Velvet) is pregnant with his son and future successor.

== Development ==
The Overlord: Raising Hell expansion was initially announced for digital download on Xbox 360's Xbox Live marketplace on November 1, 2007 for an eventual release in same month, at least in Germany. Though the separate add on (without base game) as downloadable content was postponed to an early 2008 release.

The PC downloadable content was to be released in the next year of 2008. A boxed product for PC, including the base game, this new expansion, Challenge Pack DLC, and split-screen multiplayer content, was released in Germany only in late 2007.

== Reception ==
Reception

Aggregate scores
Aggregator	Score
GameRankings	(PS3) 75%
Metacritic	(PS3) 72/100

Review scores
Publication	Score
1Up.com	B+
Destructoid	6/10
Eurogamer	8/10
GameSpot	6/10
GamesRadar+	3.5/5
GameTrailers	7.4/10
IGN	6/10
PlayStation Official Magazine – UK	7/10
Play	65%
HermitGamer	9/10

Raising Hell was met with generally positive reviews. The expansion holds a score of 72 out of 100 on Metacritic for the PlayStation 3, and a score of 75% on GameRankings.

Eurogamer continued its praise, calling it "probably one of the best games currently available on PS3". IGN however found the PS3 version to harbour many technical issues including drop in frame rate, long load times and lag in multiplayer, issues that GameSpot also found by concluding while the PS3 version is the best value for money, due to "the unpredictable frame rate, sluggish controls, and fickle camera in the PS3 version", it suggested others to "pick up the technically superior Xbox 360 version and spend a little extra to get the downloadable content". GameTrailers also found a few technical issues but concluded that "when things are clicking... With plenty of humor and a substantially long quest, players will be surprised at how enjoyable Overlord can be."
