= Wintersmith =

2006 Discworld novel by Terry Pratchett

- First edition
- Author: Terry Pratchett
- Cover artist: Paul Kidby
- Language: English
- Series: Discworld; 35th novel – 3rd Tiffany Aching story
- Subject: Characters: Tiffany Aching, Nac Mac Feegle, Granny Weatherwax, Nanny Ogg; Locations: The Chalk, The Ramtops
- Genre: Fantasy
- Publisher: Doubleday
- Publication date: 2006
- Pages: 399
- ISBN: 0-385-60984-1
- Preceded by: Thud!
- Followed by: Making Money

Wintersmith is a comic fantasy novel by British writer Terry Pratchett, set in the Discworld and written with younger readers in mind. It is labelled a "Story of Discworld" to indicate its status as children's or young adult fiction, unlike most of the books in the Discworld series. Published on 21 September 2006, it is the third novel in the series to feature the character of Tiffany Aching. It received recognition as a 2007 Best Book for Young Adults from the American Library Association.

In 2013 folk-rock band Steeleye Span collaborated with Pratchett, a fan of the band, to produce a Wintersmith concept album, released in October 2013.

== Plot ==
Tiffany Aching, now 13 years old, is training with the witch Miss Treason. But when she takes Tiffany to witness the secret "dark morris", the morris dance (performed wearing black clothes and octiron bells) that welcomes in the winter, Tiffany finds herself drawn into the dance and joins in, despite being warned earlier by Miss Treason not to do so. She finds herself face to face with the Wintersmith—the personification of winter—who mistakes her for the Summer Lady—the personification of summer. He is enchanted by Tiffany, mystified by her presence.

Unknowingly, Tiffany drops her silver horse pendant (a gift from Roland, the Baron's son) during the Dance. The Wintersmith uses the pendant to find Tiffany and give her back the pendant during their second encounter. From then on, he uses the pendant to find her and deliver his gifts. The elder witches, including Granny Weatherwax and Nanny Ogg, discover that the Wintersmith has been tracking her. Granny Weatherwax demands that she throw her silver horse pendant into Lancre Gorge.

Things get trickier for Tiffany when she discovers she has some of the Summer Lady's powers—plants start to grow where she walks barefooted, and the Cornucopia appears, causing problems by spurting out food and animals.

Before the problem with Tiffany and the Wintersmith is resolved, Miss Treason dies. The young witch Annagramma acquires Miss Treason's cottage, but she needs help from Tiffany and the other young witches before she can learn to cope on her own. Tiffany goes to live with Nanny Ogg.

The Wintersmith decides that the reason Tiffany will not be his is that he is not human. Learning a simple rhyme from some children about what basic elements comprise a human body, he sets off to gather the correct ingredients. He makes himself a body out of these elements and pursues Tiffany, but without truly understanding what it is to be human.

Granny Weatherwax instructs the Nac Mac Feegles, who watch Tiffany closely to protect their "big wee hag", to find a Hero, namely her childhood acquaintance and incipient love interest, Roland. Roland must descend into the underworld, guided by the Nac Mac Feegles, and awaken the real Lady Summer from her storybook slumber. But first the Feegles help Roland train to use a sword by providing him with a moving target (themselves inside a suit of armour). Roland and the Nac Mac Feegles go into the underworld where Roland fights creatures that feed on memories. He rescues the Summer Lady, who looks much like Tiffany and they flee back above ground.

Meanwhile, the Wintersmith continues to cover the land with Tiffany-shaped snowflakes. The harsh, prolonged winter starts burying houses, blocking roads, and killing off the sheep of the Chalk. Hiding inside her father's house, Tiffany is surprised to find her silver pendant inside a fish that her brother, Wentworth, has caught. This allows the Wintersmith to discover where she is, and he takes her to his ice palace, where she ultimately manages to stop him, melting him with a kiss, and fulfilling the Dance of Seasons, in which Summer and Winter die and are reborn in turn.

== Characters ==
- Tiffany Aching
- Wintersmith
- Summer Lady
- Roland
- Miss Treason
- Granny Weatherwax
- Nanny Ogg
- Perspicacia Tick
- Letice Earwig
- Annagramma Hawkin
- Petulia Gristle
- Feegles: The Chalk Hill Clan

== Reception ==
In general the book received positive reviews. Nicolette Jones of The Times said 'Pratchett's one-liners, the comic dialogue of the Feegles, the satire about teenagers and the credulousness of ordinary folk, and the reworking of the Orpheus myth, make for a characteristically entertaining mix.' It won the Locus Award for Best Young Adult Book in 2007.

Reading order guide
| Preceded by Thud! | 35th Discworld Novel | Succeeded by Making Money |
| Preceded by A Hat Full of Sky | 3rd Tiffany Aching Story; Published in 2006 | Succeeded by I Shall Wear Midnight |
