= The Shepherd's Crown =

2015 Discworld novel by Terry Pratchett

- First UK edition
- Author: Terry Pratchett
- Cover artist: Paul Kidby
- Language: English
- Series: Discworld; 41st Novel; 5th Tiffany Aching story
- Subject: Characters: Tiffany Aching, the Nac Mac Feegle; Locations: The Chalk
- Genre: Fantasy
- Publisher: Doubleday Childrens (PRH)
- Publication date: 27 August 2015
- Pages: 304
- ISBN: 978-0-85753-481-1
- Preceded by: Raising Steam

The Shepherd's Crown is a comic fantasy novel, the last book written by Terry Pratchett before his death in March 2015. It is the 41st novel in the Discworld series, and the fifth based on the character Tiffany Aching. It was published in the United Kingdom on 27 August 2015 by Penguin Random House publishers, and in the United States on 1 September 2015.

In early June 2015, Pratchett's daughter Rhianna Pratchett announced that The Shepherd's Crown would be the last Discworld novel, and that no further work, including unfinished work, would be published.

== Plot ==
Tiffany Aching is busy running her steading and taking care of the people of the Chalk. Jeannie, the Kelda of the Nac Mac Feegle, is worried that she is overworked. When Granny Weatherwax, Tiffany's mentor, dies, she leaves everything to Tiffany, who becomes the first among equals of the witches.

Geoffrey, the third son of Lord Swivel, is well educated, vegetarian and a pacifist. He is dissatisfied with hunting practices he considers barbaric, and after a confrontation with his father, heads towards Lancre, intending to become a witch.

Meanwhile, in the domain of the Elves, Peaseblossom senses that the passing of Granny Weatherwax has weakened the barriers between the realms. When a goblin shows the faerie court what the humans are capable of with iron and the status that goblins have achieved, Peaseblossom usurps the Queen, intending to reenter the human world and reestablish the elves' power.

Tiffany, spread thin tending to the Chalk and Granny Weatherwax's old steading, employs Geoffrey as a "backhouse boy" and starts teaching him. He and his goat get on well with everybody, and Tiffany dubs him a "calm-weaver". Intending to help old men have some autonomy from their wives, he introduces the idea of sheds (an idea he originally got from his maternal uncle).

Nightshade, the former Queen of the Elves, is found by the Feegle stationed on the Chalk at the gateway to fairyland. Her wings had been ripped off before she had been forcibly ejected from her world. The Feegles restrain her until Tiffany arrives and takes her in on her family farm. While there, Tiffany decides to carry as a talisman the shepherd's crown (a fossilised echinoid) that had been in the Aching family for many generations. She tries to teach Nightshade what it is to be human and the motivations of kindness.

Tiffany gathers the witches to prepare for an invasion by the Elves. Geoffrey marshals the old men, and assembles a fighting force. Tiffany attempts to enlist the help of the Elf King. When that fails, she assigns the Feegles to build the King a shed in the hope that it will earn his allegiance.

The elves break through at two stone circles: up in Lancre and down in the Chalk. In Lancre, they are met by the assembled witches with help from Geoffrey and the men and they are defeated. In the Chalk, they are met by Miss Tick, Letitia, Tiffany, and the Nac Mac Feegle. Nightshade, with her glamour restored, fights for Tiffany, whom she now considers a friend, until she is killed by Peaseblossom. The elves seem to have the upper hand until Tiffany, wearing the shepherd's crown, calls the power of the Chalk to bring a storm and commands the ghosts of her grandmother's sheepdogs, Thunder and Lightning. She summons the King of the Elves, who kills Peaseblossom, and she banishes the elves from the Land.

Tiffany decides to devote herself to the Chalk. She recommends that Geoffrey be given Granny Weatherwax's steading, and hand-builds herself her own shepherd's hut, reusing the old iron wheels from her late Granny Aching's shepherd's hut.

== Characters ==
- Tiffany Aching
- Nightshade
- Peaseblossom
- Geoffrey Swivel
- Esme Weatherwax

== Reception ==
Den of Geek awarded the book five out of five stars, saying "Some beloved elements of the world we've come to know over the last thirty-two years come to a close, while others are left to walk on into a world we won't get to see." The Guardian said "This is not a perfect example of Pratchett's genius, but it is a moving one."

The Shepherd's Crown sold 52,846 copies in its first three days on sale. During the second week of its release, it sold 27,386 copies in the UK, generating £318,576 in revenue.

The book received the 2016 Locus Award for Best Young Adult Book and the 2016 Dragon Award for Best Young Adult / Middle Grade Novel.

== Writing ==
In the afterword, Pratchett's assistant Rob Wilkins stated that Pratchett wrote The Shepherd's Crown's "pivotal scenes while he was still writing Raising Steam", and that "it was, still, not quite finished as he would have liked when he died" and that "he would almost certainly have written more of this book".

Neil Gaiman has claimed that Pratchett had originally planned to end the book with the revelation that Granny Weatherwax had temporarily placed her consciousness within You the cat, and that Death would only collect her in the epilogue, after she says "I am leaving on my own terms now;" however, Pratchett's health deteriorated too quickly for him to be able to write this scene. However, this has not been verified by any of Pratchett's family or publishing team.

Reading order guide
Preceded by Raising Steam	41st Discworld Novel	Succeeded by None
Preceded by I Shall Wear Midnight	5th Tiffany Aching Story	Succeeded by None
