= Overlord II =

2009 video game

- North American cover
- Developer: Triumph Studios (Note: Linux and OS X ports developed by Virtual Programming)
- Publisher: Codemasters
- Director: Lennart Sas
- Designer: Lennart Sas
- Writer: Rhianna Pratchett
- Composer: Michiel van den Bos
- Series: Overlord
- Platforms: PlayStation 3, Windows, Xbox 360, Linux, OS X
- Release: PlayStation 3, Windows, Xbox 360: NA: 23 June 2009; EU: 26 June 2009; AU: 2 July 2009; Linux, OS X 26 July 2016
- Genre: Action role-playing
- Modes: Single-player, multiplayer

Overlord II is a 2009 action role-playing game and sequel to the 2007 video game Overlord and its 2008 expansion pack in the form of Overlord: Raising Hell. It was developed by Triumph Studios (Note: Overlord II is the second and latest instalment in the Overlord series of video games among those developed by the series' originators, Triumph Studios.) and published by Codemasters for PlayStation 3, Windows, and Xbox 360. All versions were released in North America on 23 June 2009, in Europe on 26 June and Australia on 9 July 2009, alongside two spin-offs; Overlord: Dark Legend and Overlord: Minions for the Wii and the Nintendo DS, respectively. Ports for Linux and OS X were released on 26 July 2016.

Continuing the style of the series, players take the role of the Overlord, a mysterious warrior whose goal is to destroy or conquer the land by commanding hordes of small creatures known as "Minions". The story directly follows the events of the first Overlord game, with the succeeding Overlord rising to power opposing a Roman-styled military power known as the "Glorious Empire". The story was written by Rhianna Pratchett and maintains a satirical tone and dark humour towards the fantasy setting and genre.

== Gameplay ==
The core gameplay from the previous Overlord game remains intact in the sequel, with the player controlling the Overlord character in a third-person perspective who has command over hordes of small goblin-like creatures known as minions to travel the landscape and defeat various civilisations with the Roman-style "Glorious Empire" being the prime foe. Initially only the brown minions are available but eventually the Overlord will regain command of the others that are essential in overcoming obstacles that obstruct further progression of the story. With up to four kinds, each minion type is suited for different purposes such as browns for fighting and blues for healing fallen minions.

New features such as minions being able to ride wild animals are utilized to enhance their use by the player in combat.

While the Overlord himself can fight in combat with various weapons and armour types that gradually become available and the ability to cast spells to either help minions or hinder opponents, the majority of tasks are performed by the minion hordes. While minions retain many abilities including using scattered items as weaponry and armour, carry large objects in a group, turning cranks and finding treasure, minions can now also operate siege weapons, ships/boats and other war machines and, once captured, can mount and ride wild animals to help in combat and overcome obstacles. The Overlord also has the ability to occasionally take direct control over the current strongest minion to lead the rest through the use of the "Possession Stone".

The Overlord and his minions reside in a dark tower in a dimension known as the "Netherworld", where the Overlord builds up his minion forces by harvesting life-force from fallen creatures that, when gathered, can be brought back into the real world as a minion by summoning them through Minion Gates scattered across the landscape and through the Overlord himself in the less common Netherworld Gates. Treasure accumulated over time can be spent on upgrades for the tower, whether they're upgrades for gameplay or just decorative, along with large contraptions and magical objects that the minions can be ordered to return to gates, thus the tower. The choice system returns once more in Overlord II, where at certain points during quests that can be taken providing two paths; the Destruction Overlord that focuses on destroying towns and killing all in his path and the Domination Overlord that rather focuses on enslaving defeated foes or neutral parties to worship and work for him. The choice themselves not only affect the story and interactive with non-player characters, but can alter the look of the Overlord and allow certain powers to become available. Other choices such as choosing a mistress allow the Overlord to have multiple mistresses and can (re)designate any to be the primary mistress at any time.

Besides the single-player campaign, players can play various multiplayer modes online and local, both competitive and cooperative. Competitive modes includes Dominate, where rival player Overlords attempt to capture sections of the map, and Pillage where they must capture large portions of treasure. Cooperative, on the other hand, sees player Overlords working together to either defend against a constant onslaught in Survival or attack powerful foes in Invasion.

== Synopsis ==
=== Characters ===
The new Overlord (left) and Gnarl (right)

The silent protagonist Overlord from the first game is not present in Overlord II, as he was trapped in the Abyss dimension at the end of the expansion, Overlord: Raising Hell. Instead, the role of the Overlord is taken up by his child, who was removed from the original Tower to live in a mountain village, but is thrown out by the villagers to appease the Glorious Empire and, on his escape, taken in by the Minions.

Gnarl, the aged Minion advisor from the previous games, is the main recurring character in Overlord II. As an adviser and initial tutor, Gnarl engages in most of the game's dialogue, including narration, outlining objectives, dropping hints and even making jokes. Other Characters returning from Overlord include Forge Master Giblet, Gash the dungeon guard and keeper of Battle Rock, who organises events in the Overlord's personal arena, and the human Rose, confirming her as the canon mistress of the previous Overlord.

With the new Overlord comes the familiar gaggle of minions, grouped into four different sects that have different abilities and strengths: Browns; Reds; Greens; Blues. The Browns are the first sect that the Overlord has at his disposal, and frequently the most useful in any direct combat; they are more robust and can take much more damage than any other minion group, though they are susceptible to fire and poison and they drown in water higher than the Overlord's knee. Reds are the ranged attackers, hurling fireballs at enemies, combustibles and explosives; they have the added ability to remove flame from obstacles and can traverse through fiery obstacles without harm. The Greens are stealth attackers that become invisible if they are stationary, and while close to useless in a direct confrontation (without Browns), they are devastating if planted along a patrols path or if directed to attack an enemy from behind; they are also regarded as the least hygienic group, which somehow makes them immune to poison, allowing them to remove toxic obstacles and walk through toxic clouds. The Blues are medics, virtually non-combative entities that cannot participate in a melee situation alone without sustaining severe casualties, but their ability to resurrect fallen minions makes them valuable; their additional abilities include "blinking," removing magical ooze, swimming and an immunity to magic attacks.

Characters new to the series include the Overlord's three mistresses: Kelda, a strong willed village girl and the only childhood friend to the Overlord; Juno, a seductive and spoiled Empire maiden; and Queen Fay, leader of the Elves of Everlight before being corrupted by the Overlord. Three new minions are also introduced: the minion minstrel Quaver (who is not the same as the previous game's jester); Mortis, who watches over the minion hives and has the ability to resurrect fallen minion heroes; and Grubby, a brown digger who makes gates to the Netherworld and pits for Overlord to summon minions from. The story's central antagonist is the reclusive Emperor Solarius, ruler of the Glorious Empire, who is committed to conquering the world and removing all magical creatures. While Solarius appears reclusive, he has a number of henchmen who govern the various conquered lands. His second-in-command, Marius, acts as his spokesperson. A secondary antagonist is Florian Greenheart, leader of a band of fanatical environmentalist elves.

=== Plot ===
A generation has passed since the events of the first Overlord, with that game's Overlord now the ruler of the Abyss after being trapped following the events of Raising Hell. The Tower Heart was broken shortly after the old Overlord's disappearance, causing a cataclysm, which destroyed much of the old land and started a magical plague. When the survivors fled to new lands, the Glorious Empire came into being and it began to take control of the new lands, while purging all magical creatures. The old Overlord's mistress gives birth to his child, the "Overlad". The Mistress then takes the child to the mountain village of Nordberg and leaves him to grow up there, where all of the villagers (except a girl named Kelda, the Overlad's only friend) fear him, referring to him as "Witch-Boy". The brown minions find him and help cause local havoc. When the Glorious Empire besieges Nordberg, the villagers offer him up to save the town. A yeti, having been freed by the Overlord during his escape, rushes over an ice-covered lake, causing the ice sheet to break, freezing both the Overlord and the yeti until the Minions take him to the Netherworld. The Overlad is raised by Gnarl and the minions as the new Overlord while the Glorious Empire expands its borders.

Upon coming of age and passing Gnarl's tests, the Overlord scouts the Nordberg countryside with the Brown Minions, encountering a band of fanatical environmentalist elves led by Florian Greenheart, who try to prevent him from slaying baby seals, and end up taking in the yeti. Tracking the elves to one of their many Sanctuaries, the Overlord recovers the Red Minions, and uses them to destroy the Sanctuary, earning the wrath of the elven Queen Fay. The actions of the Glorious Empire lead Gnarl to classify them as a serious threat, and the Overlord heads out to both conquer the world and destroy the Empire. This begins with the Overlord capturing Nordberg, taking a now adult Kelda as his first mistress, and choosing to either enslave or destroy the village, along with an Empire governor named Borius. After melting the glaciers to free up a sailing ship, the Overlord and his horde travel to the flooded Everlight Reef, so they may access the elven lands of Everlight.

On arriving, the Overlord finds that Everlight has already been captured by the Empire, with the town being used as a resort by Empire nobles. After finding the Green Minions in the jungle and recovering the Green Hive from a nearby Empire fort, the Overlord takes control of Everlight, taking Juno (a seductress accused of being a witch by other Empire women) as a second mistress, and either kills or enslaves the town's inhabitants. Juno tells the Overlord how to access the Empire's interior territories, but while attempting to sneak in as a local governor, the Overlord falls into the slums. While exploring the slums, the Overlord comes across the Arena, a large Colosseum-like structure where magical beings are killed in gladiator-based games. The Blue Minions are rediscovered in the prisons underneath the Arena, but, before he can escape, the Overlord is apprehended by Marius, adviser to Emperor Solarius and thrown into the Arena. The Overlord defeats the waves of opponents including the yeti from before, in the process destroying a portion of the arena. Although Solarius and Marius flee, the Blue Hive is recovered, and the player has the option of either capturing the yeti, or killing it. Back at the Netherworld tower, the Overlord is visited by a mysterious woman who Gnarl vaguely recognises. The Overlord travels to the Wastelands (the site of the old Overlord's tower), and is tasked by Gnarl with finding the twelve shards of the Tower Heart. After encountering the elves' final Sanctuary, Queen Fay and Florian help the Overlord to reassemble the Tower Heart while Florian is captured by the Empire after leading the Overlord to the shards, and Fay regretfully allows the Overlord to drain four shrines to power up the Tower Heart. As this is not enough, the Overlord then drains Fay of her magical energy, corrupting her and taking her as his third mistress.

With the Tower Heart restored, the Overlord lays siege to the Empire's capital by catapulting the Heart itself into the city's anti-magic barrier. While laying waste to the city temples, the Overlord is confronted once again by the mysterious woman who is revealed to be Rose, the old Overlord's mistress. She reveals that the Empire was to bring order to the land for balance between good and evil, but Solarius let the power go to his head. Upon storming the palace, Florian appears, but reveals that he is, in reality, Solarius. Because he was an elf, but of a non-magical variety, he attempted to harness the power of the abandoned Tower Heart, but instead caused the Cataclysm and inadvertently spawned the fear of magic. From this hatred, he created the Empire and gathered the magic of the world's inhabitants for his own use. The raw magical energy drained from the captured magical creatures was collected in a vat, which Florian then dives into in the hopes of becoming a god; but instead becomes trapped inside a giant, leech-like monster, which is hailed as the Devourer by Marius. The Overlord battles and destroys both the Devourer and Florian. Depending on the player's actions during the game, one of three ending cutscenes plays: one for pure Domination, one for pure Destruction, and one for all other points on the scale. The Overlord either destroys the land or enslaves the populace, with the minions throwing huge parties. Either way, Gnarl reveals that even the Overlord's power might wane over time, finishing once again with "Evil always finds a way" before laughing maniacally off screen.

== Development ==
Overlord II was announced on 13 August 2008 for the PC, Xbox 360 and PlayStation 3. It was announced at the same time as the Nintendo spin-offs Overlord: Dark Legend and Overlord: Minions. According to Lennart Sas, director and Overlord lead at Triumph Studios, the intention for Overlord II was "massively increases the scope of the original concept", already advertising promotional screenshots displaying the new features, such as the minions ability to ride mounted creatures. According to Sas, the reason behind the sequel was due to the "massive amount creative opportunity remaining in the concept" with "an improved game engine with high production values", mostly to increase the overall scope and "epic feel", such as the inclusion of large scale battles and the use of war machines and ships. Furthermore, the developers wanted to fine-tune aspects from the original like an on screen mini-map interference while retaining the basic gameplay element. As with the original Overlord, Sas did admit influence from similar games that allowed players take the role of a character with control over other units such as Pikmin while also mentioning much of the differentiating style being a different experience. There were changes to the gameplay in order to suit the game's personality such as the Netherworld replacing the Dark Tower, being "much more alive with minion culture" and expanding the strategy elements being "important [to] expanded what the minions can do. Overlord is all about the minions. Rather than adding more base minion types (which would make controls more difficult and blur the lines between the minions), the four races are now stronger, more destructive and funnier than before." The choice system was improved over the first due to some complaints the Overlord could do good deeds over evil ones. Instead, this was replaced with the "Dominate or Destroy" structure instead.

=== Writing ===
It was confirmed that the protagonist was the implied son of the original Overlord as seen at the end of the first's expansion Raising Hell. With the continuation of the plot, Rhianna Pratchett was announced to return as the writer for the story, who was originally one of multiple writers before being the lead writer due to her "unique style and wit" being "a great match with the style and the story framework". According to Pratchett, the creative thought process behind the premise for Overlord was the appeal of villains in stories; "traditionally the bad guys always have the best of everything; the best lines, the best outfits and the best - and fluffiest - cats", feeling that "Overlord taps into what some games are lacking and that's pure, unadulterated, good fun. It produces this unrestrained, almost child-like grin in players when they see their Minions looting and pillaging, bringing back presents and dressing up in all manner of attire." The workable humor of the series was said to stem from the gameplay itself that "the gameplay, environments, missions, minion antics, voice acting and script all worked well together", which would apparently not work if "against really straight gameplay or bland environments."

Pratchett commented that due to the "active, not passive" way of story telling video games had, characterisation is consequently done in a longer time frame of script, along with the "flexible" nature due to the integration of story and gameplay. As a result, the story of Overlord II (as well as Overlord: Minions and Overlord: Dark Legend) was written in order to "sit well in the Overlord world, but not be too reliant on players having played the previous games". In the case of Overlord II specifically, the story was to remain fresh by going beyond the previous satire of fantasy by including other themes, some of which being relevant to modern times, with the "Romanesque theme" being "a lot more of what you might call modern issues underlying the story and gameplay; environmental destruction, climate change, resource hoarding, propaganda and so on, but spun through Overlord's twisted, heroic fantasy setting", as well as some characterisation being built off modern popular culture. For example, the character Florian according to Pratchett was to her "loosely based on that "Crying for Britney" guy." Because of expanded themes and by now established setting, Pratchett felt that the sequel was "a stronger story for it and feels more cohesive than the first game." Additionally, the story was said to have benefited due to the increased co-work with the Triumph Studios development team, with story and level design being developed consistently together.

=== Release and downloadable content ===
The demo for the Xbox 360 was released on 4 June 2009, before the PS3 and PC demo on 11 June 2009, ahead of the game's full release in North America on 23 June Europe on 26 June and Australia on 2 July. The demo featured the first segments of gameplay as the adult Overlord, and his first run in with Florian and the yeti in the Nordberg countryside, in line with the initial details of the game and its plot when it was first announced. Before its release, major game retailers like GameStop and Game offered collectible Minion figurines, one of each kind for those who pre-ordered the Overlord II or the Nintendo spin-offs.

In addition to its pre-release promotion, Codemasters promoted Overlord through internet based marketing campaigns. The initial announcement of the game humorously focused on a portion of the game referred to as "clubbing baby seals" that was featured in the first screenshots and playable demo. This later became involved in an online mini-game entitled "Whack-A-Seal", a game in the same style whac-a-mole where a minion would club baby seals that popped up from holes in the ice. A live-action parody of television talk shows was also produced called "The Overlord Show", where a well dressed presenter wearing the Overlord's signature helmet named Max Goreman would show off minions to a studio audience and on stage guests and how they can help with their problems, such as incinerating a woman's ex-boyfriend, before the minions would then violently rush the audience, much to Goreman's delight.

Before its release, Lennart Sas had already announced plans to develop downloadable content (DLC) with the intention of releasing it closer to the release date of the game, considering the content released for the last game to be "experimental" and "came a little too late after the release to appeal to all Overlord's players". The first DLC, entitled "Battle Rock Nemesis", was released on 30 July 2009 over Xbox Live and PlayStation Network: this DLC replicated the single-player battle arena from the original Overlord that allowed players to engage with their minions in further combat with enemies defeated during the single-player story. Developed by Virtual Programming, ports for Linux and OS X were released simultaneously on 26 July 2016.

== Reception ==
Reception

Aggregate scores
Aggregator	Score
GameRankings	75% (360); 72% (PS3); 76% (PC)
Metacritic	75/100 (360); 72/100 (PS3); 79/100 (PC)

Review scores
Publication	Score
1Up.com	A−
Eurogamer	8/10
Game Informer	6.5/10
GameSpot	7/10 (360/PS3); 7.5 (PC)
GameSpy	4/5
GamesRadar+	6/10
IGN	6/10 (360/PS3); 6.3 (PC)
Official Xbox Magazine (US)	8/10
X-Play	4/5

Upon release, Overlord II received on average a positive reception with an average critic average indicated as "generally favourable" at Metacritic (although the PS3 version was just under the score requirement), with most reviewers praising the multiple improvements over its predecessor while keeping core gameplay intact. 1UP.com complimented the game's premise, still kept enjoyable from the previous Overlord, that "commanding a legion of hilariously evil little critters to plunder and wreck everything in reach is the game's most basic appeal, and something that never really seems to get old." This linked in with the game's humour, particularly the minions' personality and charm, with GameSpy complimenting "the maniacal Gremlin-esque voices and actions of the minions, making them at once both intimidating and strangely endearing", with the added feature of naming and resurrecting certain minions that resulted in "a surprising attachment." X-Play echoed this view alone with utilising the hordes as "addictive, because you really do feel as if you're controlling your own private Gremlin horde."

On its gameplay, Official Xbox Magazine called it a "unique blend of action and strategy", helped with the added improvements over the first, including an in game mini-map and expanded options such as upgrades and choices. Eurogamer called the controls "simple yet flexible", but did find issues with an apparent "slightly wayward camera system". However, IGN considered the camera issues "painful" for being linked to control over actions at the same time. Between versions, the PC version is noted for having improved camera control over its console counterparts, with the option of shifting the camera via computer mouse described by GameSpot as "extremely handy" as opposed to the fixed console analog control. The checkpoint system was not as well received, with GamePro describing it as "unforgiving" at times.

Game Informer felt a number of features, such as the multiplayer, were "tacked on"; this along with numerous technical issues led them to conclude that "Overlord II just feels like an unpolished retread of familiar ground." Graphically, Overlord II was noted for being a noticeable upgrade from the last game, despite additional complaints of glitches; Team Xbox summarising that the graphics had "been improved, but there are still chunky spots". GameTrailers, noted that character animations during cutscenes were best described as "inert", but that the game was helped by "its dark sense of humour... coming out prominently in the game’s colourful voice acting". GameZone praised the soundtrack as "wonderfully cinematic and has that fantasy movie feel to it."
