= Overlord: Minions =

2009 video game

- North American cover art
- Developer: Climax Action
- Publisher: Codemasters
- Composer: Allister Brimble
- Series: Overlord
- Platform: Nintendo DS
- Release: NA: 23 June 2009; EU: 26 June 2009; AU: 2 July 2009
- Genre: Puzzle action
- Mode: Single-player

Overlord: Minions is a 2009 puzzle action video game developed by Climax Action and published by Codemasters for the Nintendo DS. It was announced August 14, 2008 alongside addition franchise expansions Overlord II and Overlord: Dark Legend.

It features the minions from the 2007 Overlord video game as the primary protagonists, tasked with the mission to solve puzzles and fight enemies. They are controlled by the DS stylus. There are also items to find in the levels and a timer of how fast the player in finish. The minions can be controlled directly by the player, unlike the original game where the player controlled them by controlling an eponymous Overlord-character. Controlling the Special Forces team of four, players negotiate fiendish levels and take on a huge range of warped enemies to hunt down the Kindred, a cult dedicated to resurrecting the mighty Dragon Kin, a race of humanoid dragon hybrids, determined to replace the Overlord's despotism with their own.

There are only four minions from four types, which makes all of them specialized in skills, for example Giblet, a brown minion from the first Overlord game, is the strongest in melee combat, Blaze is a wild pyromaniac, which grants him the ability to sling fireballs, Stench is the most stealthy of the bunch, and Zap can swim/heal.

== Plot ==
Giblet, Blaze, Stench, and Zap serve as Overlord Gromgard's elite Minion squad. Due to their specialized training and independence, they are sent to eliminate any outside opposition to their Overlord's reign.

Their first mission is to deal with mysterious fungus growth in the neighboring Withering Woods. As they fight through the woods, they find that the fungal ooze is not only infecting plants, but the Overlord's Human subjects as well. They finally discover the contamination: a sentient fungus, Globulous. After Globulous is killed, the minions are sent to enter the massive pipes which fed the fungus.

The sewer pipes lead to the Halfling town, Briarthorn Burrows. The squad discovers that the threat to their Master's dominion is the mysterious Kindred cult. The cult desires to bring back the extinct Dragon-Kin, an extinct Human-Dragon race. After tearing through Briarthorn Burrows, the Minions confront Grub, the Halfling, Kindred lieutenant. The monstrous halfling was easily dispatched by the squad.

The elite Minions enter Cloudland Keep at the top of Shimmer Mountain. They eliminate Lady Opal, the crystalline Kindred Lieutenant who commands the human contingent of the cult.

The Minions advance to the Fossilized Temple of the Dragon-Kin, where the Minions face heavy opposition from the Dwarves. The squad pushes through the Dwarven defense, and encounter another Lieutenant, Duggen. Despite his immense size and strength as a mutant Dwarf, he is no match for the Minions.

The next destination for the Overlord's Minions is the Floating Forest, where the Kindred's army of Elves has established a strong position. The Elven defenders are overwhelmed and the Minions advances to fight the final Lieutenant, the dragon-elf hybrid Ash. With Ash's demise, the Overlord's forces are free to advance to the Kindred's final stronghold, Dragonspire.

In Dragonspire, the Minions encounter Silas Silvanus, the last Dragon-Kin and leader of the Kindred. Silvanus explains how he desires to restore and perfect his race. He tries to destroy the Overlord's servants, but the Dragon-Kin is mortally wounded by the squad. Before Silvanus dies, he unleashes his final experiment, Tiberius. Although he was the strongest, experimental offspring of Silvanus, Tiberius is destroyed by the Minions, bringing a permanent end to the Kindred.

== Reception ==
Reception

Aggregate scores
Aggregator	Score
GameRankings	61%
Metacritic	58/100

Review scores
Publication	Score
1Up.com	D+
Destructoid	7/10
GamePro	3.5/5
GameSpot	4.5/10
GamesRadar+	55%
GameZone	6/10
IGN	6.1/10
Nintendo Power	7/10
Nintendo World Report	7/10
Official Nintendo Magazine	51%

A Eurogamer preview of the title observed the debt to The Lost Vikings video game, and claimed the developers had sensibly revised the genre and gameplay to be more relevant to the host console.

The game was met with mixed reception upon release, as GameRankings gave it a score of 61%, while Metacritic gave it 58 out of 100.
