= Overlord: Dark Legend =

2009 video game

- North American cover art
- Developer: Climax Action
- Publisher: Codemasters
- Composer: Michiel van den Bos
- Series: Overlord
- Platform: Wii
- Release: NA: 23 June 2009; EU: 26 June 2009; AU: 3 July 2009
- Genre: Action role-playing
- Mode: Single-player

Overlord: Dark Legend is an action role-playing game developed by Climax Action and published by Codemasters for the Wii. The game was released on 23 June 2009 in North America, 26 June in Europe, and 3 July in Australia.

Dark Legend is a spinoff of the 2007 video game Overlord, and is set as a prequel. The gameplay is similar to Overlord, but presents some differences. While the game does not have several features of the original game or its sequel, Overlord II, it offers some new content and a new gameplay style taking advantage of the Wii controller.

Reviews of the game are mixed. Reviewers praised the humour, story, and controls of the game, but found problems with the animation, short game length, and lack of complexity or difficulty.

== Gameplay ==
Much of the basic gameplay is similar to that of Overlord. The four minion types (brown, red, green, and blue) and their abilities remain unchanged from the original. However, the game presents some differences in terms of gameplay design. For example, unlike the other Overlord games, the life force collected from defeated enemies and used to create minions is no longer colour-dependant.

The Wii Remote's nunchuk attachment is used to control the Overlord, while the remote itself is used to organise and control the minions, capitalising on the controller's motion sensor and pointer capabilities. Unlike Nintendo's New Play Control! Pikmin, however, Dark Legend also incorporates additional gesture controls for special abilities, such as one that lets the player grab a minion from the horde using the tilt and motion sensors in the Wii remote, shake the remote to imbue the minion with the Overlord's power, then release it to run at a target and explode.

== Plot ==
Dark Legend is set before the events of Overlord. The game features a new storyline, with new characters and locations, written by Rhianna Pratchett, who also wrote for the other games in the Overlord series.

Overlord: Dark Legend screenshot, showing Gnarl and the new Overlord

Instead of the unnamed Overlord introduced in the previous game, Dark Legend follows the story of a new Overlord, named "Lord Gromgard". In the form of puppet show-esque cutscenes, the Overlord's story is told (with Gnarl doing the narration). Lord Gromgard, as a child, was told by Gnarl that, on his sixteenth birthday, his destiny would be fulfilled. As the years passed, the kingdom suffered many problems in the form of blights, poor crop harvests, Halflings taking the local food, bandits stealing from the populace and wolves eating or destroying what was left. Desperate to reclaim his fame, the Overlord's father, the once mighty Duke Gromgard, set out on a quest to acquire some of his lost assets, only to return with nothing and to find his wife, Duchess Gromgard, had run off with a rich and strong nobleman from a neighbouring kingdom. On his sixteenth birthday, Lord Gromgard is left alone when his father sets out on yet another quest to reclaim his fortune, leaving Lord Gromgard with his extremely unpleasant older siblings, Lord Greenville and Lady Gerda.

After getting a birthday present, the Overlord's Minion-commanding gauntlet, Lord Gromgard finds the Dark Tower and the Overlord armour that once belonged to his uncle, the mysterious Black Baron, and begins to learn the ways of the Overlord. He begins his rule by tearing apart his brother and sister's room (with help from some Brown Minions), and repels a Halfling infestation. The Halflings start a castle-wide fire. Planning on stopping this, the Overlord finds the Red Minion Hive and returns it to the castle. He destroys the remains of the Halflings, but incurs the wrath of the insane castle jester, a Halfling named Jinks, who was behind the attack. Fighting the Overlord in a pumpkin-launching makeshift tank, Jinks is sent flying after the Overlord causes the tank to explode. A brown Minion takes Jinks' title as the castle jester. The Overlord goes to reclaim the castle forge, that is in the hands of the notorious "Black Flame Bandits". Using a rock giant to thin their numbers, the Overlord reclaims the forge and establishes some dominance in the world. He visits the nearby town of Meadowsweet, where he meets a bard named Nym, who asks him to kill the local wolves encroaching on the town. The Overlord kills them, and returns to town to meet a little girl in a red hood, who asks him to take her to her grandma's house in the forest. The Overlord escorts the little girl, to find the girl is a wolf queen. After slaying the wolf queen, the Overlord learns from the children he freed that they have seen the Blue Minions, mentioning that the local children have been disappearing after visiting a cookie salesman. The Overlord intimidates the salesman, who claims the real person behind this is a kind witch named Doris, who lives in the woods. The Overlord finds the cookie sales are being used by Doris to earn money from the tooth fairy (the cookies cause children's teeth to fall out). The Overlord shuts down her business, and takes care of the last of the fairytale creatures.

The player contends with the Overlord's brother and sister, who are siding with the Elves and Dwarves (respectively) to start a war and claim the kingdom for themselves. Using the robes of Dwarven emissaries, the Overlord slips into the Elves' hideout, freeing the Green Minions and destroying the Elves plant-like monsters. However, Erasmus, the Elven leader, sees through the Overlord's disguise, and tries to stop him, only to die. Lord Greenville misunderstands Erasmus's dying words, thinking that Gerda is responsible (thanks due to the Overlord leaving a Dwarven item near Erasmus's spot of death), and takes over as leader of the Elves. The Overlord steals the robes of Elven emissaries, planning to perform a repeat of what happened to the elves. The Dwarves king, Widget (like Erasmus before him), sees through the Overlord's disguise, and attacks in a robot-like suit. The Overlord kills him and blames the Elves, leaving his sister to lead the Dwarves. The final cutscene shows the two forces fighting for years, only to have both sides give up after so long. Both Lord Greenville and Lady Gerda return to Castle Gromgard to be enslaved, leaving Lord Gromgard to rule as the Overlord.

== Development ==
Rather than port the original video game to the Nintendo Wii console, Dark Legend was designed from scratch for a Wii gaming experience.

The game was released in 2009: in North America on 23 June, Europe on 26 June, and Australia on 3 July.

== Reception ==
Reception

Aggregate scores
Aggregator	Score
GameRankings	70%
Metacritic	68/100

Review scores
Publication	Score
Game Informer	7/10
GameSpot	5.5/10
GameZone	7.1/10
IGN	7.5/10

Opinions of Dark Legend have been mixed. Dark Legend had received a ranking of 70% from review aggregator GameRankings, derived from 23 reviews, and a score from Metacritic of 68 out of 100 from 30 reviews.

Reviews found the storyline, humorous dialogue, and cutscenes reminiscent "of a Monty Python comedy" to be strong features of the game. The controls and use of the Wii remote's capabilities was believed to be well executed, although the AI of the minions left something to be desired. Game Informer said that "The story is never more than an excuse for silliness, but it serves its purpose right up until the end, when an abrupt conclusion leaves you scratching your head."

Graphics were good with well-designed environments, but animation was found to suffer as more minions and enemies were on screen. GameSpot Australia found that bugs and animation problems caused the game to crash the Wii three times during their review playthrough, while the Totally Gaming Network review also noted the game's propensity to crash.

The main failing of the game was the length (averaging eight to ten hours for a first-run playthrough), which was compounded by the lack of complexity or difficulty. The Gamezone review suggested that Dark Legend was best suited for players new to the franchise, but veterans of the first game would be better off with the sequel, Overlord II, on another platform; while GameSpot Australia referred to the game as "My First Overlord", believing the game never moved beyond the basics of the franchise. Game Informer felt that the game is "overly simplistic", which "hurts the experience".
