= Unseen Academicals =

2009 Discworld novel by Terry Pratchett

- First edition
- Author: Terry Pratchett
- Cover artist: Paul Kidby
- Language: English
- Series: Discworld; 37th novel – 7th individual story
- Subject: Association football (soccer); Characters: Mustrum Ridcully, Ponder Stibbons, The Librarian, Rincewind, Havelock Vetinari, Lady Margolotta; Locations: Ankh-Morpork
- Genre: Fantasy
- Publisher: Doubleday
- Publication date: 2009
- ISBN: 0385609345
- Preceded by: Making Money
- Followed by: I Shall Wear Midnight

Unseen Academicals is the 37th novel in Terry Pratchett's Discworld series. The novel satirises football, and features Mustrum Ridcully setting up an Unseen University football team, with the Librarian in goal. It includes new details about "below stairs" life at the university. The book introduces several new characters, including Trevor Likely, a street urchin with a wonderful talent for kicking a tin can; Glenda Sugarbean, a maker of "jolly good" pies; Juliet Stollop, a dim but beautiful young woman who might just turn out to be the greatest fashion model there has ever been; and the mysterious Mr Nutt, a cultured, enigmatic, idealistic savant. According to the publisher, Transworld, the "on sale" date for the hardback was 1 October 2009 although the official publication date is 8 October 2009. Bookshop chain Borders included a small set of exclusive Discworld football cards with each book.

The title is a play on the names of rugby and football teams in the UK who have or have had a connection to educational institutions, examples being Hamilton Academical and Edinburgh Academicals.

The time in between the publication of Unseen Academicals and the previous Discworld entry, Making Money, was over 2 years, making it the longest time between Discworld novels since 1983's The Colour of Magic and 1986's The Light Fantastic. However, it made up for this in part by being the longest Discworld novel, 25 000 words longer than any other book in the series. Between 1986 and 2007, at least one Discworld novel was published every year. This delay was in part due to Pratchett's Alzheimer's diagnosis, which led to a great deal of his time being taken up with interviews and public advocacy.

== Synopsis ==
After the centennial Hunting of the Megapode (a satirisation of the Mallard ceremony performed at All Souls College, Oxford), the faculty of Unseen University discover that they must, as per tradition, play a game of football, in exchange for their large financial endowment from the late Archchancellor Preserved Bigger. If not, they will lose 87.4% of the university's food bill, and be forced to have (only) three meals a day. The wizards soon learn that the local version of football (similar to the actual game of mob football) is very violent and deaths are common. Thus, in collaboration with the city's tyrant Lord Vetinari, they set out to make new 'official' football rules, based on translations of the rules from an ancient urn, which includes forbidding the use of hands and mandating the use of official footballs as opposed to the makeshift balls the street games use. With the prestige of UU under threat, the rise of Brazeneck College in Pseudopolis as a centre of magical learning and the return of Henry (formerly the Dean) to Ankh-Morpork as a rivalling Archchancellor do much to antagonise Archchancellor Ridcully.

Parallel to this, the book tells the story of four young people. A candle dribbler named Mr Nutt discovers that he is not what he thinks he is and must overcome the fear of his race, both by humans and by himself. He is also chosen to train the university's team for the big match. Trev Likely, who is Mr Nutt's coworker and best friend, is the son of Ankh-Morpork's most famous deceased footballer Dave Likely (who had scored a record of four goals throughout his entire career), but has promised his (late) dear old mum that he won't play, but ultimately saves the game. Glenda is a friend of Mr Nutt and Trev, runs the Unseen University Night Kitchen, and bakes the Disc's best pies. Juliet works for Glenda, has a crush on Trev (despite coming from families that support different teams), is simple and beautiful, and becomes a famous fashion model and the new face of dwarvish micromail (chainmail as soft as cloth). The four of them end up advising the wizards on their football endeavour. The novel culminates in an intense game between the Unseen Academicals and Ankh-Morpork United, a team made up of previously warring mob football teams including Dimwell and Dolly Sisters competing to prevent the more civilised game from becoming accepted, refereed by Archchancellor Henry (on the grounds that his divided loyalties to Unseen and Brazeneck would ultimately make him impartial).

== Characters ==
- Glenda Sugarbean
- Juliet Stollop
- Trevor Likely
- Mr Nutt
- Lord Vetinari
- Madame Sharn
- Pepe
- Andy Shank
- Mustrum Ridcully
- Ponder Stibbons

== Themes ==
- Football (Soccer)
- Athletic Teams
- Sports Fandom
- Fashion & Modeling
- College Rivalry
- University Traditions
- Racial Insecurity
- Self Worth
- Crab mentality

== Television adaptation ==
A proposed two-part television adaptation was to be produced by The Mob for broadcast on Sky1 (and in high definition on Sky1 HD), with filming set to take place in 2011. It was to have been the fourth in a series of adaptations, following Hogfather, Colour of Magic, and Going Postal. By August 2012, however, it was reported that The Mob's option for the rights had not been not renewed.

== Audio dramatisation ==
It was announced by Discworld Monthly on 29 May 2018 that Audible has created an Audio Dramatisation of Unseen Academicals. The adaptation has been directed by Dirk Maggs, and the cast includes Josie Lawrence, Matthew Horne, Tony Gardner, and Phil Davis amongst others. It will be available to purchase on Audible from 2 July 2018

== Reviews ==
Reviewing the book for his site Boing Boing, Cory Doctorow praised Pratchett's ability to make him like this novel despite his lack of interest in football and rated it one of his top five Discworld novels, while cautioning that the book, unlike previous works, requires the reader to be familiar with the characters and setting. The Guardian's Harry Ritchie also favourably reviewed the novel, highlighting the reliability of Pratchett's comedy, especially the figures of speech he regularly used such as a kiss sounding like "a tennis ball being sucked through the strings of a racket".

Peter Ingam, writing for The Telegraph, opined that the quality of Pratchett's writing and humour remained as high as ever. Matt Barber, reviewing the book for Den of Geek, concluded that Unseen Academicals was "almost perfectly rounded social satire", adding that the only minor criticism he could offer was that the main characters were so interesting that side stories such as Glenda and Nutt's romance were eclipsed by wanting to see the main story progress; he also outlined that he read the book with Pratchett's Alzheimer diagnosis in mind but found his writing to actually have improved rather than suffered.

Reading order guide
Preceded by Making Money	37th Discworld Novel	Succeeded by I Shall Wear Midnight
Preceded by A Collegiate Casting-Out of Devilish Devices	9th Individual Story; Published in 2009	Succeeded by None
Novels by Terry Pratchett
Preceded by Nation		Succeeded by I Shall Wear Midnight
