= Kurti & Doyle =

British scriptwriting team

Kurti and Doyle
- Born: Richard Kurti; Bev Doyle
- Occupations: Screenwriters, Playwrights
- Known for: Sherlock Holmes and the Baker Street Irregulars; Kidnapped; Terry Pratchett's Going Postal

Kurti & Doyle are a British scriptwriting team comprising Richard Kurti and Bev Doyle. They're best known for their work on fantasy television series such as BBC One's Robin Hood (2006), ITV1's Primeval (2007) and Sky 1's Sinbad (2012).

== Career ==
Prior to their team up, Kurti directed short films and documentaries after training at the BBC. Beginning in 1995, Kurti & Doyle's work in independent British cinema led to a two-year writing contract with US studio Miramax. Following this they moved into television writing, starting with EastEnders and Eldorado, followed by a three-part adaptation of Robert Louis Stevenson’s novel Kidnapped, for BBC One.

Their two part BBC Sherlock Holmes drama Sherlock Holmes and the Baker Street Irregulars was produced by Andy Rowley for RDF Media (kids) and screened on BBC One in March 2007. They also wrote the two-part adaptation of Terry Pratchett's novel Going Postal for Sky 1 HD, and wrote the Tandem Communications/Syfy co-production The Lost Future, an action adventure TV movie set in a future that suffers from genetic regression. They worked on the 2019 BBC Nature documentary series Serengeti.

They were to write a live-action version of Rudyard Kipling’s The Jungle Book for Pathé Films and the BBC. They later adapted the novel for Audible as Rudyard Kipling’s The Jungle Book – The Mowgli Stories. Kurti & Doyle have written extensively for audio: for B7 Media, they wrote an audio drama reboot of the iconic British science fiction comic Dan Dare, distributed by Big Finish; and an adaptation of Ray Bradbury’s The Martian Chronicles, starring Derek Jacobi and Hayley Atwell, also distributed by Big Finish; and wrote the sci-fi thriller podcast The Effect, commissioned from B7 Media by Audible.

=== Solo works ===
Independent of the partnership, Kurti has authored novels. Monkey Wars was published in 2013 by Walker. The novel's plot focuses on two warring tribes of primates, the Langurs and the Rhesus. It was longlisted for the Carnegie Medal in 2014. Walker would then publish Maladapted in 2015. In 2023, Sapere Books would begin publishing Kurti's Basilica Diaries Medieval Mysteries, a series of historical mystery novels set in Renaissance era Rome.
