= Richard Coyle =

English actor (born 1972)

- Born: 6 February 1972 (age 54); Sheffield, England
- Occupation: Actor
- Years active: 1998–present
- Spouse: Georgia Mackenzie (m. 2003; div. 2010)
- Children: 1

Richard Coyle (born 6 February 1972) is an English film, television, and stage actor. He has also narrated numerous audiobooks. Coyle got his big break on the television comedy Coupling, playing the role of Jeff Murdock. He played the lead role in the TV film Going Postal and in Renny Harlin's film 5 Days of War. In 2012, Coyle joined the cast of the show Covert Affairs as Simon Fischer, an FSB agent and love interest for Piper Perabo's Annie Walker. In 2018, Coyle was cast as Father Faustus Blackwood, a high priest of the Church of Night and Dean of the Academy of the Unseen Arts in the Netflix series Chilling Adventures of Sabrina. He played the role of Aberforth Dumbledore in Fantastic Beasts: The Secrets of Dumbledore.

On the stage, Coyle played the lead in Peter Gill's 2002 stage premiere of The York Realist, and later in the Donmar Warehouse production of the play Proof, in London, alongside Gwyneth Paltrow. He played the title role in Michael Grandage's production of Friedrich Schiller's Don Carlos. In 2008 he starred in Harold Pinter's The Lover and The Collection at the Comedy Theatre in London. In 2010, he played John in Mark Haddon's play Polar Bears at the Donmar Warehouse, London. In 2014 he played MacDuff in the Kenneth Branagh and Rob Ashford directed Macbeth at the Park Avenue Armory, New York City. In 2022 Coyle starred in the role of Atticus Finch in the West End debut of Aaron Sorkin's adaptation of Harper Lee's American classic, To Kill a Mockingbird.

== Early life and education ==
Richard Coyle was born on 6 February 1972, in Sheffield, England. His father was a builder, and he is the fourth of five sons.

While working a stint on a ferry, entertaining passengers, Coyle was told by a theatre director that he had talent and should pursue it. As described by Madeline North for The Independent,

Coyle's first encounter with a stage was at [University of York, see following]. Wondering how to fill his time between politics lectures, he signed up for the drama society ("it was the most colourful stand in the place") and found himself in an existential two-hander about Franz Kafka. An actor was born.

North went on to note that a local charity had "got[ten] him through school" with financial support. Coyle would graduate from a program in Languages and Philosophy at the University of York, in 1995. He was then accepted into the drama course at Bristol Old Vic, with the same local charity that had supported him at York again "stump[ing] up the cash". He would graduate in 1997.

== Film and television work ==
Coyle played Mr Coxe in 1999's BBC version of Wives and Daughters. He also appeared in the television programme, Lorna Doone (2000). Also in 2000, Coyle had his big break, in his portrayal of the character, Jeff Murdock, in the sitcom Coupling.

Coyle also starred in the 2001 version of Othello, as Michael Cassio. He starred in the short-lived 2002–2003 BBC show Strange. In 2003 he chose not to return to Coupling for its fourth series, and refused requests to return for a "goodbye episode". In a subsequent interview, Coyle stated this was to avoid typecasting:

I'm very proud to have been part of Coupling and very grateful for the chance to play Jeff but I was very keen that that character didn’t stick with me forever. I’m an actor and I want to be an actor when I’m 60. It’s a lifelong process; why cut it off by boxing yourself into a little pigeonhole early on?

In 2004, Coyle played the role of Alcock, body servant to John Wilmot, 2nd Earl of Rochester, in The Libertine alongside Johnny Depp. He appeared in a new special television episode of Cracker: Nine Eleven in October 2006.

Coyle was cast in 2010 in the lead role, Moist von Lipwig, in the film Going Postal, based on the book of the same name by Terry Pratchett, which was broadcast on television in May 2010. He appeared in Mike Newell's 2010 film Prince of Persia: The Sands of Time, playing Jake Gyllenhaal's older brother, the ambiguous Crown Prince Tus. In September 2011, Coyle appeared as William Winthrop, in Madonna's feature-directorial debut W.E., about the Duke and Duchess of Windsor.

Coyle played Wallace in Outpost: Black Sun (2012), the sequel to the 2008 British horror film Outpost, and the lead of drug pusher Frank in the 2012 English-language remake of Nicolas Winding Refn's 1996 cult classic Pusher. Also in 2012, Coyle joined the cast of the USA Network show Covert Affairs as Simon Fischer, an FSB agent and love interest for Piper Perabo's Annie Walker. His character recurred until halfway through season three.

In 2014, NBC began airing the series Crossbones, with Coyle as Tom Lowe, who is assigned to kill the pirate Blackbeard (played by John Malkovich). In 2018, Coyle was cast as Father Faustus Blackwood, a high priest of the Church of Night and Dean of the Academy of the Unseen Arts in the Netflix series Chilling Adventures of Sabrina.

In January 2021, Coyle announced via Instagram that he had been cast in Fantastic Beasts: The Secrets of Dumbledore, scheduled to be released in 2022, but said he could not disclose whom he was playing. When the trailer came out that December, it was confirmed that he would be playing Aberforth Dumbledore. In 2026, in the BBC and BritBox adaptation of Janice Hadlow's Pride and Prejudice spinoff, The Other Bennet Sister, Coyle stars as Mr Gardiner, alongside Indira Varma as Mrs Gardiner. Mr Gardiner is Mary Bennet's worldly and kind uncle who takes her under his wing, helping her gain confidence outside of her family's shadow.

== Stage roles ==
Coyle was cast as the lead in Peter Gill's 2002 stage premiere of The York Realist, and later in the Donmar Warehouse production of the play Proof, in London, alongside Gwyneth Paltrow. On that success, he was cast in Patrick Marber's reworking of August Strindberg's play After Miss Julie with Kelly Reilly and Helen Baxendale.

From September to November 2004, Coyle played the title role in Michael Grandage's production of Friedrich Schiller's Don Carlos, which then transferred to the West End from January to April 2005 (where the cast included Derek Jacobi, Peter Eyre and Una Stubbs).

Coyle was in Peter Gill's production of John Osborne's Look Back in Anger at the Theatre Royal, Bath from August to September 2006. In 2008, he starred in Harold Pinter's The Lover, and The Collection at the Comedy Theatre in London, alongside Charlie Cox and Gina McKee. In 2010, he played John in Mark Haddon's play Polar Bears at the Donmar Warehouse, London.

In 2014, Coyle played MacDuff in the Kenneth Branagh- and Rob Ashford-directed Macbeth, at the Park Avenue Armory, in New York City.

Coyle premiered the role of Larry Lamb in James Graham's new play Ink, which opened at the Almeida Theatre under the direction of Rupert Goold, which later transferred to the Duke of York's Theatre in the West End; In it, Coyle stars alongside Bertie Carvel who plays Rupert Murdoch.

From August through November 2022, Coyle starred in the role of Atticus Finch in the West End debut of Aaron Sorkin's adaptation of Harper Lee's American classic, To Kill a Mockingbird. He went on to play the character Henry in "Player Kings" on the West End, from April to June 2024.

== Other media ==
Coyle played Keats in the game Folklore, and, as of this date, had narrated the audio books,

- At The Mountains of Madness; and
- The Shadow Over Innsmouth, both by H. P. Lovecraft;
- Resistance by Owen Sheers; and
- the H.I.V.E. series of novels by Mark Walden (2010).

He has narrated the Moist von Lipwig series of audiobooks for Penguin, in which Peter Serafinowicz voices the character, Death, and Bill Nighy reads the work's narrative footnotes. This series of re-recorded versions of Terry Pratchett's Discworld audiobooks was released in February 2023. (In 2021, Penguin announced production would begin on a reissue of the series, again featuring Nighy and Serafinowicz, with the only further mention of participation being "a cast of leading names from British stage and screen".)

== Filmography ==
=== Film ===
Year	Title	Role	Notes
1998	Macbeth	Loon	Television film
1998	The Life and Crimes of William Palmer	John Parsons Cook	Television film
1998	What Rats Won't Do	Journalist	
1999	Human Traffic	Andy	
1999	Topsy-Turvy	Mr Hammond	
2000	Hearts and Bones	Will Stenner	Television film
2000	Lorna Doone	John Ridd	Television film
2001	Sword of Honour	Trimmer McTavish	Television film
2001	Young Blades	Count Morlas	
2001	Happy Now?	Joe Jones	
2001	Othello	Michael Cass	Television film
2003	Blight	John Blight	Short film
2003	Friday Night In	Ben	Short film
2004	Gunpowder, Treason & Plot	Catesby	Television film
2004	The Libertine	Alcock	
2006	Ultra	Cryptic Man	Television film
2006	The Best Man	Michael Sheldrake	Television film
2006	Cracker	D.I. Walters	Television film
2006	A Good Year	Amis	
2007	The History of Mr. Polly	Jim	Television film
2008	Franklyn	Dan	
2008	Blight	John Blight	
2008	The Pro	Tony Kirby	Short film
2009	Octavia	Gareth Llewellyn	Television film
2010	Prince of Persia: The Sands of Time	Tus	
2010	Terry Pratchett's Going Postal	Moist Von Lipwig	Television film
2011	5 Days of War	Sebastian Ganz	
2011	W.E.	William	
2012	Grabbers	Garda Ciarán O'Shea	
2012	Outpost: Black Sun	Wallace	
2012	Pusher	Frank	
2013	The Food Guide to Love	Oliver Byrne	
2022	Fantastic Beasts: The Secrets of Dumbledore	Aberforth Dumbledore	
2025	Heads of State	Quincy Harrington	

=== Television ===
Year	Title	Role	Notes
1998	Hetty Wainthropp Investigates	Miles Miller	Episode: "A Minor Operation"
1999	Greenstone	Sir Geoffrey Halford	Unsold TV pilot
1999	Up Rising	Martin Marr	Unsold TV pilot
1999	Wives and Daughters	Mr Coxe	2 episodes
2000–02	Coupling	Jeffrey "Jeff" Murdock	22 episodes
2000	Dalziel and Pascoe	Martin Hallingsworth	Episode: "A Sweeter Lazarus"
2002–03	Strange	John Strange	7 episodes
2007	The Whistleblowers	Ben Graham	6 episodes
2010	Miami Medical	Doctor	Pilot episode
2012	Life of Crime	Detective Inspector	3 episodes
2012	Covert Affairs	Simon Fischer	7 episodes
2014	Crossbones	Tom Lowe	9 episodes
2015	A.D. The Bible Continues	Caiaphas	12 episodes
2016	The Fall	Joe O'Donnell	3 episodes
2016	The Collection	Paul Sabine	8 episodes
2017	Born to Kill	Peter	2 episodes
2018	Hard Sun	Thomas Blackwood	2 episodes
2018–2020	Chilling Adventures of Sabrina	Father Blackwood	Main cast
2023	Six Four	Robert Wallace	Main cast
2023	Then You Run	Reagan	Main cast
2024	The Gathering	Jules	Main cast six-part drama
2026	The Other Bennet Sister	Mr Gardiner	4 episodes

== Personal life ==
Coyle was married to actress Georgia Mackenzie; they divorced in 2010. From early 2011, he was in a relationship with actress Ruth Bradley. By 2017 this had ended and he was seeing someone else.
