= Terry Pratchett's The Colour of Magic =

2008 English fantasy movie directed by Vadim Jean

- Title Card
- Genre: Fantasy comedy
- Created by: Terry Pratchett
- Based on: The Colour of Magic; The Light Fantastic by Terry Pratchett
- Written by: Vadim Jean
- Directed by: Vadim Jean
- Starring: David Jason; Sean Astin; Tim Curry
- Voices of: Christopher Lee
- Narrated by: Brian Cox
- Theme music composer: Paul Francis; David Hughes
- Country of origin: United Kingdom
- No. of episodes: 2

Production
- Producers: Rod Brown, Ian Sharples
- Running time: 189 minutes

Original release
- Network: Sky1
- Release: 23 March – 24 March 2008

Related
- Terry Pratchett's Hogfather; Terry Pratchett's Going Postal

Terry Pratchett's The Colour of Magic is a fantasy-comedy two-part British television adaptation of the bestselling novels The Colour of Magic (1983) and The Light Fantastic (1986) by Terry Pratchett. The fantasy film was produced for Sky1 by The Mob, a small British studio, starring David Jason, Sean Astin, Tim Curry, and Christopher Lee as the voice of Death. Vadim Jean both adapted the screenplay from Pratchett's original novels, and served as director.

Terry Pratchett's The Colour of Magic was broadcast on Sky One, and in high definition on Sky 1 HD, on Easter Sunday (23 March) and 24 March 2008. The first part drew audiences of 1.5 million, with the second part attracting up to 1.1 million viewers. The film was well received by fans, but drew mixed reviews from critics, who generally praised the acting talent of the all-star cast, but criticised the film's script and direction.

The production is the second adaptation of Pratchett's novels as a live-action film, following the successful release of Hogfather on Sky 1 over Christmas 2006. A third adaptation, Going Postal, followed in 2010.

== Plot ==
The plot of the adaptation largely follows the first two Discworld novels, The Colour of Magic and The Light Fantastic. The story follows the misadventures of Rincewind, a wizard who is expelled from Unseen University after spending 40 years failing to learn even the most basic magic. In fact, Rincewind's head holds one of the eight spells from the Octavo, the most powerful spellbook in the Discworld, and he has been unable to learn others because "they were afraid to be in the same head" as the Octavo spell. Rincewind is forced by the Patrician of Ankh-Morpork to act as a local guide for Twoflower, a property insurance salesman and the Discworld's first tourist, who is visiting Ankh-Morpork, and Twoflower's luggage, which is made from Sapient Pearwood and can run on its own legs.

After a misunderstanding over an insurance policy causes the owner of the inn where Twoflower and Rincewind are staying to commit arson, the pair flee the city. They proceed across the disc, encountering a variety of mythical creatures, most of which lead to near-death experiences for Rincewind. Fortunately for Rincewind, the Octavo spell in his head precludes him from actually dying, resulting in several comic encounters with Death. Meanwhile, a significant power struggle is occurring within the Unseen University. Narrator Brian Cox explains that "in the competitive world of wizardry, the way to the top is via dead men's pointy shoes... even if you have to empty them yourself". The power-hungry wizard Ymper Trymon (Tim Curry) plans to become Archchancellor. Trymon assassinates several faculty members but is thwarted by the incumbent Archchancellor, Galder Weatherwax, and his superior magical knowledge of the Octavo. Trymon knows there is no point in deposing the Archchancellor until he learns how to control the Octavo, which is growing increasingly restless as Rincewind (and the spell in his head) moves further away from Ankh-Morpork and into greater danger.

Rincewind and Twoflower are eventually washed rimwards to the kingdom of Krull, which lies on the very rim of the disc, where they are taken prisoner. The astronomers and "astrozoologists" of Krull have for many years attempted to determine the sex of Great A'Tuin, and are on the verge of launching a space vehicle to carry a pair of "chelonauts" on a new mission over the rim of the disc. Unaware of this, Rincewind and Twoflower take the place of the two chelonauts and 'escape' to the spacecraft, which they accidentally launch, catapulting them off the rim. The prospect of losing the eighth spell in this fashion prompts the Octavo to act, causing A'Tuin to perform a barrel roll to recapture Rincewind, landing the pair near the centre of the disc. Watching the Octavo's restlessness, the Archchancellor reveals his intention to use the Rite of AshkEnte to ask Death about the Octavo and also about a large red star that has recently appeared in the sky. Now knowing all he needs, Trymon throws Weatherwax from the Tower of Art and becomes Archchancellor in his place.

The red star grows steadily larger, and the worried people of Ankh-Morpork mob the Unseen University because the wizards appear unable to save the disc from it. Trymon learns from Death that all eight spells of the Octavo must be said together at the solstice to save the disc from destruction and that Great A'Tuin is flying towards the red star for a purpose that Death says is " NOTHING TO DO WITH ME." Tryon dispatches a group of mercenaries, led by Herrena, to capture Rincewind and retrieve the eighth spell, along with a force of wizards. Meanwhile, Rincewind and Twoflower encounter Cohen the Barbarian (87 years old and retired), and Twoflower rescues Bethan, a human sacrifice in a druid ritual. A battle between the wizards and Rincewind leaves Twoflower in a coma; Rincewind rescues him from Death's door, and Cohen in turn rescues Rincewind and Twoflower from Herrena and the mercenaries.

The four take a ferry to Ankh-Morpork, where the populace is rioting because the star is now larger than the disc's own sun. Trymon assembles the senior wizards of the University, and orders them to unchain the Octavo. When they release the spellbook, Trymon steals it and locks the wizards in its chamber. Rincewind releases them and they follow Trymon to the top of the Tower of Art, afraid that he will attempt to say the spells and that they will destroy his mind (and the rest of the world). Trymon, however, says the first seven spells successfully and gains near-ultimate power, and turns the wizards to stone. Rincewind fights Trymon, who is eventually killed, returning the spells to the Octavo. Rincewind expunges the eighth spell from his head, completing the set, and reads the entire spellbook.

The red star is finally revealed as a world-turtle breeding ground: the Octavo spells prompt several eggs orbiting the star to hatch into juvenile discworlds, which follow Great A'Tuin as it returns to deep space. The narrator tidies up a few loose ends: the Octavo is eaten by the luggage, which Twoflower donates to Rincewind. Rincewind, now able to learn new spells with the departure of the 8th spell from his head, re-enrolls at Unseen University. Cohen and Bethan decide to get married (despite the 60 year age difference), with Cohen celebrating by commissioning some Din Chewers, made from troll's teeth (pure diamond). Twoflower presents them with a dozen gold coins as a wedding gift. Although Twoflower, who comes from the Counterweight Continent where gold is extremely common, considers this a small sum Rincewind comments that in Ankh-Morpork a dozen gold coins is enough to buy a small kingdom. Twoflower returns home on a ship and Rincewind returns to the Unseen University with the Luggage happily following.

=== Differences from original texts ===
Although the film generally remains true to the original novels, several scenes and characters were removed or merged with others to bring the script to a reasonable length. Noting that "there wasn't time for everything", the producers cut completely the scene in the Temple of Bel-Shamharoth and the associated plotline about the significance of the number eight; Director Vadim Jean defended the decision, saying "we could have gone there, but we went to the Wyrmberg instead. There [were] time constraints and we could have gone one way or the other, so we went the whole hog on just one." The scenes in the Wyrmberg were themselves shortened and simplified, reducing the character of Li!ort to a cameo and losing the characters of K!sdra, Greicha and Hrun completely.

The inter-wizard rivalry at Unseen University ("Dead Man's Pointy Shoes"), by contrast, was expanded and spread out throughout the film, while in the novels the sequences are short and mainly found in The Light Fantastic. This established Trymon as a more easily recognisable antagonist.

To avoid the necessity of explaining the deus ex machina in detail, the Octavo in the film simply causes A'Tuin to roll to recapture Rincewind, whereas in the novel, a complicated "change spell" returns him to the disc. The creatures from the Dungeon Dimensions which invade reality at the end of The Light Fantastic, and Rincewind's fight in the Dungeon Dimensions themselves, are completely omitted, and Trymon is simply driven mad by reading the Octavo spells at the end of the film version. Galder Weatherwax is also killed by Trymon in the film version, whereas, in the books, he is killed by accidentally summoning the Luggage instead of Rincewind.

In the book, Rincewind never attempted suicide, whereas in the film version, he tries to take his own life by jumping into the river Ankh. His circumstances of spotting the Luggage are additionally different: in the book he spots it while sitting in the Broken Drum, while in the film he spots it while being carried up from the River Ankh on an empty pallet.

In the book, Twoflower was toothless and wore dentures. In the film, Twoflower's teeth were his own.

== Production ==
The adaptation was produced by The Mob, with Rod Brown, Ian Sharples, Elaine Pyke and Sarah Conroy credited as producers. Vadim Jean continued his involvement with the film as director.

=== Adaptation ===
The Colour of Magic is the second live-action adaptation of Terry Pratchett's Discworld series, following the highly successful Hogfather, which was broadcast over Christmas 2006 to an audience of 2.6 million. After the success of Hogfather, Pratchett was easily persuaded to release the rights for The Colour of Magic and The Light Fantastic. Vadim Jean was employed to adapt the two literary works into a three-hour, two-part screenplay. While Pratchett was given "carte blanche" to "turn up whenever [he] wanted", he was happy to see a more liberal interpretation of his first two works than he had been for Hogfather. Speaking to Sky Magazine, Pratchett said that, "There [was] not so much emotional baggage... riding on The Colour of Magic and The Light Fantastic. It was just this book of mine that suddenly started selling incredibly well". Jean's main challenge was to streamline the plot and remove the many tangents that are a feature of Pratchett's work, without destroying the appeal of the books. Jean said that "there [was] a real danger, with this story, that one could strip out the 'Pratchett-ness'... I had to fight to keep [it] in". Pratchett was pleased with the final script, saying "it wasn't the slaughter job I thought it would have to be", and "[we've managed] to keep the soul... it's still recognisably [the same] book".

=== Filming ===
Filming took place at Pinewood Studios for the interior scenes of the Wyrmberg, the Octavo room in the Unseen University, and for exterior shots of Ankh-Morpork and the Broken Drum. Pinewood's exterior water tank, the largest in Europe, was also employed for the scenes where Rincewind and Twoflower are washed towards the edge of the world. These sequences, as well as being the most challenging to film, were also one of the most physically exhausting for the cast. Background shots of Niagara Falls were also taken, and digitally merged with the bluescreen film shot at Pinewood, location shots taken on a river in Wales, and CGI sequences of A'Tuin and the Discworld. Digitally combining all this material together in a believable fashion was, according to Jean, "the toughest week of the shoot". All the digital effects and CGI for the film were provided by Fluid Pictures, a small digital effects group based in Soho.

Jean, who had adapted and directed Hogfather in 2006, was keen to return to some of the locations used in that film to provide continuity. The scenes in the Great hall of the Unseen University were filmed in the crypt of the Guildhall in the City of London, and Dorney Court (Dorney, Buckinghamshire), the same Tudor/Victorian country home was used for Death's house, as had been seen in Hogfather, appears again here. This time around, Jean was able to film more extensive panoramic shots in the latter location, thanks to The Colour of Magic's larger budget. Other filming locations included Anglesey and Snowdonia for exterior shots, Gloucester docks as the docks of Ankh-Morpork, and the Royal Courts of Justice as the Patrician's Palace.

=== Effects ===
David Jason as Rincewind and Karen David as Liessa filming the inverted sword fight in the Wyrmberg cavern.

When choreographing the various fight sequences in the film, Jean sought to maintain the atmosphere and humour of the Discworld while still creating an exciting action sequence. Jean explained that "the tone of all these fights is the tone of Discworld... it has a kind of chaos to it... there are very few set pieces, it's more about the chaos and the humour". Although all the fight sequences were carefully controlled for safety, some were choreographed to be more haphazard than others; each fighter was also given their own style for variety and humour. Liz May Brice (Herrena) noted the contrast in the ferry fight sequence, saying "the way we've done the fight, he [Cohen the Barbarian] is almost [winning] by mistake... it's sort of fun, whereas [Herrena] is very deliberate".

The inverted fight between Rincewind and Liessa in the Wyrmberg, by contrast, was the most meticulously choreographed sequence in the film. In addition to the need to add CGI backdrops to every shot, hanging upside down from wires whilst fighting proved to be what David Jason described as "a nauseous experience". The sequence had to be filmed in very short bursts as "all of the actors and stunt people could only manage around four to five minutes before they wanted to [vomit]". Karen David, who played Liessa, pulled several stomach muscles during the filming, and Jason described the experience as like "being hung upside-down like the last chicken at Sainsbury's... I wouldn't do that again in a hurry".

== Casting ==
David Jason was the first actor to be cast for the production, as it had always been his desire to play Rincewind in a film adaptation of The Colour of Magic. Jason had mentioned in an interview some fifteen years previously that, of all the parts available, the character of Rincewind was the one he coveted the most. Jason describes the wizard as "just such an amusing, endearing character... I always kept this idea in my head that one day I [would] play Rincewind". Jason's appointment to the role, announced in April 2007, drew mixed reactions, with comments ranging from "terrible choice" to "brilliant". A common criticism was that Jason, at 68, was too old to play a character who is, according to the books, middle-aged.

From the day Jason was cast, rumours began to fly that a major American actor would be cast alongside him to bolster the film's international appeal. On 31 July 2007 it was revealed that Sean Astin, world-famous for his part in the Lord of the Rings film trilogy, had been signed for the role. Before filming started, Sean had to ask his agent just who "Dave Jason" was and left the video store with two large bags of David Jason's back catalogue to watch. The casting of Tim Curry as Trymon and Christopher Lee as the voice of Death was revealed at the same time. The choice of Astin as Twoflower was criticised by some fans, who had anticipated that the tourist would be Asian. Pratchett responded to this criticism in an open letter, where he noted that he had only described Twoflower as "exotically foreign" until Interesting Times. The choice of Lee to replace Ian Richardson, who had voiced Death in Hogfather, was more widely accepted; Lee had previously voiced the part in the animated adaptations of Soul Music and Wyrd Sisters.

The part of the Patrician of Ankh-Morpork, Havelock Vetinari, was not revealed until the premiere of The Colour of Magic, where Jeremy Irons, billed as a "guest star", was revealed to have played the role. A small number of Pratchett fans were invited to participate as extras in the mob scenes towards the end of the film, and the bar fight in the Mended Drum.

Several members of the cast previously had roles in Sky One's previous adaptation of Pratchett's novel Hogfather, including David Jason as Albert, Nigel Planer as Mr. Sideney, and Stephen Marcus as Banjo and Nicolas Tennant, who previously had played Corporal ‘Nobby’ Nobbs. Pratchett himself had also made a cameo in Hogfather as The Toymaker. Nigel Planer had also previously contributed his voice to Discworld audiobooks, as well as the computer games Discworld II: Missing Presumed...!? and Discworld Noir.

=== Principal cast ===
- David Jason as Rincewind, a failed wizard and the main protagonist.
- Sean Astin as Twoflower, the Discworld's first tourist.
- Tim Curry as Trymon, the power-hungry senior wizard at the Unseen University and the main antagonist.
- Brian Cox as the Narrator
- Christopher Lee as DEATH (voice)
- Marnix van den Broeke as DEATH (Physical on-set)
- Jeremy Irons as Lord Vetinari, the Patrician of Ankh-Morpork.
- David Bradley as Cohen the Barbarian, the most famous barbarian in the Discworld, now 'retired'.
- Laura Haddock as Bethan, a druid sacrifice, who falls in love with Cohen.
- James Cosmo as Galder Weatherwax, the incumbent Archchancellor of the Unseen University.
- Nicholas Tennant as Head Librarian of the Unseen University, who is turned into an orangutan during the events of the film.
- Karen David as Liessa, a dragonlady from the Wyrmberg.
- Liz May Brice as Herrena, a mercenary who is employed to capture Rincewind.
- Nigel Planer as the Arch-Astronomer of Krull.
- Richard Da Costa as The Luggage.
- Roger Ashton-Griffiths as Lumuel Panter.
- Miles Richardson as Zlorf, the leader of the Ankh-Morpork Assassins' Guild.
- James Perry as Kring, the enchanted sword.
- Stephen Marcus as Broadman, the bartender at the Broken Drum.

Terry Pratchett appears in a cameo role, playing Astrozoologist #2 in the opening and closing scenes of the film. Richard Woolfe, the director of programming at Sky One, also appears as the Alchemist.

== Release and reception ==
A teaser trailer, released in late February 2008, featured principal cast members, including Rincewind, Twoflower, Trymon and the Arch-Astronomer of Krull, attempting to describe octarine, the 'colour of magic'. The teaser concludes with the film's tagline: "a pigment of your imagination". Two more trailers were released in March 2008, containing a more complete synopsis, with narration by Brian Cox. The trailers formed part of a multimillion-dollar advertising campaign in partnership with Amazon.com and Borders Books. In addition to conventional adverts in national newspapers and banner ads on sites including MSN.com and Yahoo!.com, Sky launched a viral marketing campaign, and established a bluetooth hotspot at Victoria station, London, where fans could download video clips and ringtones to mobile phones.

The film was premiered at the Curzon Cinema, London, on 3 March 2008; the event was covered in several major newspapers after David Jason, somewhat inebriated, got into the wrong limousine by mistake when departing from the premiere.

The film was released in two parts, breaking at roughly the same place as the literary versions of The Colour of Magic and The Light Fantastic, although some scenes (such as Trymon's murder of the Archchancellor) were moved across the break for dramatic effect. The first part, concluding with Rincewind and Twoflower falling off the edge of the disk in the Krullian spaceship, was broadcast on Easter Sunday (23 March 2008), at 6pm GMT on Sky1 and Sky 1 HD. The second part was broadcast on the same channels at 6pm the following day (Easter Monday). Viewing audience for the first part reached 1.5 million, 8% of the viewing total. The second part of the film attracted an average audience of 967,000, peaking at 1.1 million during the 15 minute block from 7:15 pm.

The film was generally well received by critics, with The Times believing it to be "better than Sky's previous Discworld adaptation Hogfather". The Scotsman admitted that it was a "good-looking production that proper fans probably appreciated", but criticised the film for being "far too long... with leaden direction and script". The Times agreed, saying that "It looked good, in an over-glossy, Hallmark Productions kind of way, although every now and again the budget... looked stretched".

Pratchett himself said he was "very pleased" with the casting and production of the film, although he admitted that seeing his literary work adapted for the screen was "very bad for me: it's like I'm wandering around on the inside of my own head".

The film was released on DVD and Blu-ray Disc on 3 November 2008.

In the United States and Canada, it is premiering as The Color of Magic on the Ion channel.

The North American DVD was released on 14 July 2009. The version available on Netflix is the original British presentation.
