= Moist von Lipwig =

Fictional character of the Discworld novels

- Discworld character
- Von Lipwig on the cover of Making Money
- First appearance: Going Postal (2004)
- Last appearance: Raising Steam (2014)
- Created by: Terry Pratchett
- Portrayed by: Richard Coyle

In-universe information
- Affiliation: Ankh-Morpork Post Office, Royal Mint, and Bank

Moist von Lipwig is a fictional character from Terry Pratchett's Discworld series. A "reformed con-man" who is one of the major characters of the series, von Lipwig is the protagonist of the novels Going Postal, Making Money, and Raising Steam.

== Plot summary ==
=== Background ===
Pratchett does not provide an extensive backstory for von Lipwig, born in the town of Lipwig in Überwald, where he lost his parents at an early age. In Going Postal, he is described as being bullied at school, and running away to become a traveling conman. Since Moist is an unreliable narrator, the reader is unsure of whether parts of his backstory are true, for example, he is unclear on his age and his living through the breakup of the unholy empire.

He is also described as having no notable physical traits, and so characters forget him easily. Descriptions of his height, appearance and age vary between different characters in the novel, which he uses to his advantage, by wearing disguises such as fake glasses and ear hair wigs. Before his eventual capture, he uses a variety of different aliases, and becomes an expert forger of handwriting.

=== Civil service ===
In Going Postal, Lord Vetinari, the Patrician of Ankh-Morpork arranged to have Lipwig survive his hanging. When Lipwig woke up, Vetinari offered him a job as Ankh-Morpork's Postmaster General which Lipwig could take or reject of his own free will (the alternative being, essentially, death, again of his own free will). At that time, the city's postal service had long since ceased operation, the remaining two employees doing useless things punctiliously every day. The task of restoring it had claimed the lives of four of Vetinari's clerks, and the competing and mercilessly corporate Clacks network, the Grand Trunk Clacks Company, was being run by a conman, Reacher Gilt. Lipwig nonetheless manages to revive the postal service by applying the principles of the con to honest work, introduces the postage stamp and causes the downfall of the Grand Trunk Clacks Company by exposing the fraudulent practices introduced by Gilt. By the beginning of Making Money, the Clacks network is run by the Ankh-Morpork Postal Service.

Moist, and the Post Office, has a very minor cameo in Thud!. Commander Vimes notices that the Ankh-Morpork Post Office has issued two different sets of stamps commemorating the Battle of Koom Valley, one in which the Dwarfs are winning the battle, the other the Trolls, and he makes an angry remark about "that pea-brain at the Post Office" (probably referring to Stanley, the Head of Stamps Dept, who's known to have been raised by peas). He also mentions the cabbage stamp with the potentially explosive cabbage scented glue, of which Corporal Nobbs has stolen the Watch's confiscated examples.

In Making Money, Moist is very respectable and is up for many rewards and seats due to his efforts. He also breaks into his own office just to keep things interesting. The Patrician offers Moist the additional job of running the Royal Bank of Ankh-Morpork and the Royal Mint just behind it. He refuses this offer. Vetinari does not force him to take the job as he did in Going Postal, because he knows that Moist will eventually accept. Moist denies this despite Vetinari's accusations that he is bored of working at the post office. However, the chairwoman of the bank leaves all her shares to her dog Mr Fusspot when she dies (thereby making the dog the new chair of the bank), and leaves the dog to Moist. The Assassin's Guild is alerted to the situation and contracted to kill Moist should he refuse the job or should Mr. Fusspot be killed. Therefore, he becomes responsible for the bank. Moist becomes the Master of the Royal Mint, introduces paper money to Ankh-Morpork, and revolutionizes the bank, while keeping it out of the hands of the greedy Lavish family who sit on the board of directors. At the end of the novel, it was suggested that Moist would be appointed to the position of Chief Tax Collector.

In Raising Steam, steam locomotives are invented and plans are made by Lord Vetinari and the Ankh-Morpork and Sto Plains Hygienic Railway Company to construct railway lines ultimately to as far away as Genua. Moist is first tasked with negotiating the purchase or acquisition of lands needed for railway construction, first throughout the Sto Plains, and later Quirm. Following a palace coup against the Low King of the Dwarves, Rhys Rhysson, Moist is required to fulfil the logistically difficult task of constructing a railway line to Schmaltzberg. Despite Moist's own protestations regarding the impossibility of the task, he nevertheless succeeds and the Low King is restored to power with little resistance. At the Wilinus Pass, it is suggested that Moist secretly, and without authorization, used Ankh-Morpork's Umian golems (brought to the city in Making Money) to somehow convey a train over the ravine. While everyone else involved with the journey are given honours and medals, Moist's reward is being allowed to continue living.

=== Personal life ===
Moist von Lipwig meets and begins courting Adora Belle Dearheart in Going Postal. By Making Money, the two are engaged. Dearheart plays an important role in Lipwig's life, in that dating her provides him with the dangerous thrill he needs in his life. When she is away, he needs to perform various dangerous activities, such as climbing high buildings and extreme sneezing.

Lipwig is not a follower of a particular god. However, a con he perpetrated in Going Postal led to a massive increase in the popularity of the goddess Anoia. In Making Money, he takes up praying to her, on the basis that she owes him for her newfound popularity.

In "Raising Steam", it is revealed that Moist and Adora Belle have since married and now live in a mansion on Scoone Avenue, in Ankh (the same area where the Duke and Duchess of Ankh, Sam and Sybil Vimes, live). While Moist continues to run both the Royal Ankh-Morpork Post Office and the Royal Mint and Bank, Adora Belle runs the Clacks and has made it an equal opportunities employer, also hiring golems and Goblins.

== TV adaptation ==
Richard Coyle as Moist von Lipwig

In the Sky TV adaptation of Going Postal, von Lipwig was portrayed by actor Richard Coyle. Coyle also narrates the Moist von Lipwig series of Discworld novels, adapted by Audible.

== Reception ==
The character was included in a list of the top ten Discworld characters by The Daily Telegraph in 2013; Tim Martin states that the character "gives Pratchett the opportunity for some of his finest satiric stabs at modern culture". In a review of Making Money for The Guardian, Patrick Ness describes von Lipwig as "a fresh new character" written "to poke serious fun at City institutions". Jim Shanahan, in a chapter on Pratchett's works, describes the character as a "reformed con-man" who "drives technological change". Amy Lea Clemons, in a chapter on Discworld, describes von Lipwig as a "complicating character"; she comments on his use of language to deceive his audience and states that the character presents a contrast with the "more rigid ethical rhetorics" of Granny Weatherwax, Sam Vimes and Carrot Ironfoundersson. Michelle West, in a review of Going Postal for The Magazine of Fantasy & Science Fiction, describes von Lipwig as "the anti-Vimes; he's not a man who believes, and hates believing in a world that gives him so little purchase; he's a man who doesn't believe. In anything./ Which is part of what makes the book so satisfying". Kirkus Reviews, in a review of Making Money, describes von Lipwig as a "brilliant scalawag of a hero".
