= Nation (novel) =

2008 novel by Terry Pratchett

- Author: Terry Pratchett
- Cover artist: Jonny Duddle
- Language: English
- Genre: Alternative history, Fantasy
- Publisher: Doubleday
- Publication date: 11 September 2008
- Publication place: United Kingdom
- Pages: 416
- ISBN: 978-0-385-61370-5
- OCLC: 231884187

Nation is a novel by Terry Pratchett, published in the UK on 11 September 2008 and in the US on 6 October 2009. It was the first non-Discworld Pratchett novel since Johnny and the Bomb (1996). Nation is a low fantasy set in an alternative history of our world in the 1860s. The book received recognition as a Michael L. Printz Honor Book for 2009.

== Development ==
Pratchett took his editors by surprise by writing it before the previously scheduled Tiffany Aching conclusion. He said "I want to write this one so much I can taste it", and that he had been ready to do it for four years. Pratchett said in February 2007, "At the moment I'm just writing. If it needs to be Discworld it will be Discworld. It could be set in this world 150 years ago while still more or less being a fantasy. The codename for it is Nation."

== Synopsis ==
=== Context ===
Written loosely in a third-person perspective, the novel is set in an alternative history of our world, shortly after Charles Darwin has published On the Origin of Species. A recent Russian influenza pandemic has just killed the British king and his next 137 heirs. Except for the opening chapter, the novel's action entirely occurs in the Great Southern Pelagic Ocean (the fictionalised South Pacific Ocean) on a particular island known by its indigenous inhabitants as "the Nation".

The first chapter involves a subplot in which the Gentlemen of Last Resort, a secret society serving the Crown, urgently set out for Port Mercia in the Great Southern Pelagic Ocean to seek the next man in the British line of succession: Henry Fanshaw, the unsuspecting governor of England's oceanic territories. Fanshaw's 13-year-old daughter, Ermintrude, is one of the novel's two protagonists. The other protagonist, Mau, is an indigenous native of the Nation who is first depicted alone at neighbouring Boys' Island, where he has hand-built a canoe to complete his initiation rite from boyhood into manhood. Ermintrude, meanwhile, is travelling in a leisurely manner aboard a British schooner, the Sweet Judy, when mutineers, led by the ruthless First Mate Cox, are subdued and set adrift at sea, returning to the plot at a later time.

=== Plot summary ===
The main plot begins when an enormous tsunami carries the two central characters, Ermintrude and Mau, to the shores of Mau's home island: the Nation. Mau survives the tsunami in his canoe, while Ermintrude is the lone survivor of the Sweet Judy, which is run aground. The tsunami has killed all the indigenous villagers of the Nation, except Mau, who now angrily rejects the gods and believes that his interrupted rite of passage has left him soulless. Devastated, Mau carries all his people's corpses into the ocean, based on their religious belief that humans buried at sea become dolphins. Ermintrude timidly and sometimes recklessly interacts with Mau, but, eventually, the two start cooperating for mutual survival and establish some basic level of communication, though they are ignorant of each other's culture and language. Ermintrude introduces herself as "Daphne" and never reveals her given name, which she has always hated.

Survivors from neighbouring islands sporadically arrive, including the priest Ataba, who constantly derides Mau for his loss of faith, and two English-speaking brothers. One of these men gratefully employs the reluctant Daphne as a makeshift midwife for his pregnant wife, Cahle. Meanwhile, Mau sleeplessly keeps vigil, obsessively looking out for local cannibals who are known to strike without warning. At the same time, he frequently hears the pestering, disembodied voices of the Grandfathers: ancestral spirits who make angry (and often incoherent) demands. They insist that Mau replace the "god anchors", carved white stones traditionally said to have "anchored" the gods before the tsunami displaced them. Mau discovers the anchors in the Nation's lagoon alongside an additional, previously unknown stone, but Ataba attempts to destroy it, purportedly because it is heretical. Mau then rescues Ataba from the lagoon, but his resulting hypothermia and exhaustion lead to a coma; Daphne accepts a lump of poison from Mrs. Gurgle, a shaman who is one of the refugees, that successfully lets her travel in her mind to the land of the dead in order to rescue Mau's consciousness.

Daphne begins hearing the voices of the Grandmothers, who claim to be the neglected but more sensible counterparts to the Grandfathers. They suggest that Daphne explore an ancient, closed-off crypt called the Grandfathers' cave. Mau, Daphne, Ataba, and their companions enter this cave and discover that the Nation is probably the oldest civilization on Earth, whose citizens once made astounding scientific progress with such creations as telescopes, eyeglasses, and even accurate star charts.

After exiting the cave, the group is confronted by two of Sweet Judy's villainous mutineers, who abruptly kill a spear-wielding Ataba and briefly abduct Daphne before she devises a cunning escape. In the meantime, the mutineers' leader, Cox, has since joined the cannibals, becoming their self-proclaimed chief and planning to raid the Nation. The new inhabitants of the Nation convince the arriving Cox and the cannibals to follow tradition by having the leaders of each side fight in hand-to-hand mortal combat, so as to avoid large-scale bloodshed. Mau accepts his role as leader of the Nation, and then cleverly outwits and kills Cox in the lagoon, causing the cannibals to flee.

A few days later, Henry Fanshaw arrives in search of his daughter. As a man of scientific curiosity, he, like Daphne, is fascinated with the re-opened cave. The Gentlemen of Last Resort appear two weeks later, telling Fanshaw that he is the next heir to the British throne and immediately crowning him king. Mau, wary of England's politics, is reluctant for the Nation to join the British Empire and instead requests that his homeland become a member of the scientific Royal Society. Ultimately, Daphne feels a duty to leave with her father, and Mau remains behind on the island with his new people.

Many years later, in the present day, an old scientist concludes this story to two children of the modern-day Nation. He explains that Daphne returned to England to marry a Dutch prince (later becoming Queen) and that Mau died of old age. When Daphne died, two months after Mau, her body was sent to the Nation to be buried at sea so that she could become a dolphin. He tells the children that from those days onward, thousands of scientists have visited the island, including Charles Darwin, Albert Einstein, Carl Sagan, and Richard Feynman. The book ends with the elder of the two children, a girl, standing guard on the beach, protecting the Nation as Mau had done so many years before: this is stated to be the Nation's new rite of passage into adulthood. In the lagoon, a dolphin leaps from the sea and the scientist smiles.

== Reception ==
The novel was well received, with The Independent calling Nation 'one of his finest books yet', the Washington Post 'a thrilling story', and The Guardian printing "Nation has profound, subtle and original things to say about the interplay between tradition and knowledge, faith and questioning."

Times Online called the novel "Thought-provoking as well as fun, this is Terry Pratchett at his most philosophical, with characters and situations sprung from ideas and games with language. And it celebrates the joy of the moment."

Nation has also received many accolades:

- 2008, Los Angeles Times Book Prize for Young Adult Literature winner
- 2008, Sidewise Award for Best Long-Form Alternate History nominee
- 2009, American Library Association, Top Ten Best Books for Young Adults
- 2009, Boston Globe-Horn Book Award for Fiction and Poetry winner
- 2009, Locus Award for Best Young Adult Book nominee
- 2009, Michael L. Printz Award for Excellence in Young Adult Literature Honor Book
- 2009, Mythopoeic Fantasy Award for Children's Literature nominee
- 2009, Odyssey Award nominee
- 2010, July 15, Brit Writer's Award Published Writer winner
- 2010 Carnegie Medal nominee
- Guardian Children's Fiction Prize nominee

== Adaptation ==
The Royal National Theatre performed a theatrical adaptation of the book by Mark Ravenhill with music by Adrian Sutton. Previews started on November 11 and the show opened on November 23, 2009. Readings from the novel began on BBC Radio 7 on Saturday 30 January 2010 at 1800 and 2400.

Pratchett noted: "I believe that Nation is the best book I have ever written, or will write."

== See also ==
- Nan Madol – a remaining archipelago of islands of a once larger island

Novels by Terry Pratchett
Preceded by Making Money	Nation	Succeeded by Unseen Academicals
