= Making Money =

2007 Discworld novel by Terry Pratchett

- First edition
- Author: Terry Pratchett
- Cover artist: Paul Kidby
- Language: English
- Series: Discworld; 36th novel – 2nd Moist von Lipwig story
- Subject: The Mint, gold standard, fiat currency, computer simulation; Characters: Moist von Lipwig, Lord Vetinari, Adora Belle Dearheart; Locations: Ankh-Morpork
- Genre: Fantasy
- Publisher: Doubleday
- Publication date: 2007
- Awards: Locus Award for Best Fantasy Novel (2008)
- ISBN: 0385611013
- Preceded by: Wintersmith
- Followed by: Unseen Academicals

Making Money is a fantasy novel by British writer Terry Pratchett, part of his Discworld series, first published in the UK on 20 September 2007. It is the second novel featuring Moist von Lipwig, and involves the Ankh-Morpork mint and specifically the introduction of paper money to the city. The novel won the Locus Award for Best Fantasy Novel in 2008, and was nominated for the Nebula Award the same year.

== Plot ==
Moist von Lipwig is bored with his job as the Postmaster General of the Ankh-Morpork Post Office, which is running smoothly without any challenges, so the Patrician tries to persuade him to take over the Royal Bank of Ankh-Morpork and the Royal Mint. Moist, though bored, is content with his new lifestyle, and refuses. However, when the current chairwoman, Topsy Lavish, dies, she leaves 50% of the shares in the bank to her dog, Mr Fusspot (who already owns one share of the bank, giving him a majority and making him chairman), and she leaves the dog to Moist. She also made sure that the Assassins' Guild would fulfill a contract on (assassinate) Moist if anything unnatural happens to the dog or he does not do as her last will commands.

With no alternatives, Moist takes over the bank and finds out that people do not trust banks much, that the production of money runs slowly and at a loss, and that people now use stamps as currency rather than coins. His various ambitious changes include making money that is not backed by gold but by the city itself. Unfortunately, neither the chief cashier (Mr. Bent, who is rumoured to be a vampire but is actually something much worse, a clown) nor the Lavish family are too happy with him and try to dispose of him. Cosmo Lavish tries to go one step further—he attempts to replace Vetinari by taking on his identity—with little success. However all the while, the reappearance of a character from von Lipwig's past adds more pressure to his unfortunate scenario.

Moist's fiancée, Adora Belle Dearheart, is working with the Golem Trust in the meantime to uncover golems from the ancient civilization of Um. She succeeds in bringing them to the city, and to everyone's surprise the "four golden golems" turn out to be "four thousand golems" (due to a translation error) and so the city is at risk of being at war with other cities who might find an army of 4000 golems threatening. Moist discovers the secret to controlling the golems, and manages to order them to bury themselves outside the city (except for a few to power clacks towers and golem horses for the mail coaches) and then decides that these extremely valuable golems are a much better foundation for the new currency than gold and thus introduces the golem-based currency. Eventually, an anonymous clacks message goes out to the leaders of other cities that contains the secret to controlling the golems (the wearing of a golden suit), thus making them unsuitable for use in warfare (as anyone could wear a shiny robe).

At the end of the novel, Lord Vetinari considers the advancing age of the current Chief Tax Collector, and suggests that upon his retirement a new name to take on the vacancy might present itself.

== Characters ==
- Moist von Lipwig, Postmaster General and Vice Chairman of the Royal Bank of Ankh-Morpork.
- Adora Belle Dearheart, fiancée of Moist and manager of the Golem Trust
- Mr Fusspot, Chairman of the Bank
- Lord Vetinari, Patrician
- Mr Mavolio Bent, Chief Cashier of the Bank
- Cosmo Lavish, a director of the Bank
- Rev Cribbins, villain with impressive teeth

== Themes ==
According to Pratchett, Making Money is both fantasy and non-fantasy, as money is a fantasy within the "real world", as "we've agreed that these numbers of conceptual things like dollars have a value".

== Promotional items in the UK hardcover first edition ==
Some High Street booksellers have additional exclusive promotional material glued under the inside of the dust jacket:

- Borders include an Ankh-Morpork cheque book
- Waterstone's include a few Ankh-Morpork bank notes

== Reception ==
Kim Newman, writing for The Independent, called the book "on-the-nose and up-to-the-minute in its subject", praising the villain and the narration. The Guardian's Patrick Ness praised the book's humanity, and its "sharp questions (...) about why we trust banks (...) as well as the nature of money", but noted that the book "is not quite as successful as" Going Postal due to the lack of some of Going Postal's forward drive. The Observer's Rowland Manthrope was critical of the book, saying that "Pratchett has wit here, but has lost his normal cutting edge". Nick Rennison, from The Sunday Times, said that while "Making Money is not vintage Discworld", "it still offers more comic inventiveness and originality than most other novels of the year. And more fun."

Reading order guide
Preceded by Wintersmith	Novels by Terry Pratchett	Succeeded by Nation
Preceded by Wintersmith	36th Discworld novel	Succeeded by Unseen Academicals
Preceded by Going Postal	2nd Moist von Lipwig story Published in 2007	Succeeded by Raising Steam
