= Lorna Doone (2000 film) =

British TV series

- Based on: Lorna Doone by R.D. Blackmore
- Written by: Adrian Hodges
- Directed by: Mike Barker
- Starring: Martin Clunes; James McAvoy; Aidan Gillen; Amelia Warner; Richard Coyle; Jesse Spencer
- Music by: John Lunn
- Country of origin: United Kingdom
- Original language: English
- No. of series: 1
- No. of episodes: 3

Production
- Executive producers: Gareth Neame; Jane Tranter; Delia Fine
- Producer: Deirdre Keir
- Cinematography: Chris Seager
- Editor: Guy Bensley
- Running time: 75 minutes (TV version); 150 minutes (Movie version)
- Production company: A&E Television Networks for BBC

Original release
- Network: BBC One
- Release: 24 December – 26 December 2000
- Network: A&E
- Release: 11 March 2001

Lorna Doone is a British romance/drama television mini-series version of Richard Doddridge Blackmore's 1869 novel of the same name that aired on BBC One from 24 to 26 December 2000 in the UK and on A&E on 11 March 2001 in the U.S. The film won the Royal Television Society's Television Award for Best Visual Effects by Colin Gorry.

== Cast ==
- Lorna Doone - Amelia Warner
- John Ridd - Richard Coyle
- Carver Doone - Aidan Gillen
- Jeremy Stickles - Martin Clunes
- Sir Ensor Doone - Peter Vaughan
- Sarah Ridd - Barbara Flynn
- Baron de Whichehalse - Martin Jarvis
- Judge Jeffreys - Michael Kitchen
- Counsellor Doone - Anton Lesser
- Uncle Reuben - Jack Shepherd
- Tom Faggus - Anthony Calf
- Marwood de Whichehalse - Jesse Spencer
- Lizzie Ridd - Joanne Froggatt
- Annie Ridd - Honeysuckle Weeks
- Ruth Huckaback - Rebecca Callard
- Betty Muxworthy - Ruth Sheen
- Gwenny Fairfax - Helen Coker
- John Fry - Trevor Cooper
- Sergeant Bloxham - James McAvoy
- Young John Ridd - Jack Baverstock
- Young Lorna Doone - Katie Pitts Drake
- Charley Doone - Oliver Chris
- Jack Ridd - Neil Finnigan
- Parson Bowden - Trevor Peacock
- Colonel Kirke - Pip Torrens
- James II & VII- Robert Addie
