= Terry Pratchett's Going Postal =

2010 British television series

- Main cast
- Genre: Fantasy, comedy, steampunk
- Created by: Terry Pratchett
- Based on: Going Postal by Terry Pratchett
- Screenplay by: Richard Kurti and Bev Doyle
- Directed by: Jon Jones
- Starring: Richard Coyle; David Suchet; Charles Dance; Claire Foy; Andrew Sachs; Ian Bonar
- Voices of: Nicholas Farrell
- Narrated by: Richard Coyle (as main character) (part one only)
- Composer: John Lunn
- Country of origin: United Kingdom
- Original language: English
- No. of episodes: 2

Production
- Executive producers: Rod Brown, Vadim Jean, Ian Sharples
- Production locations: Budapest, Hungary
- Cinematography: Gavin Finney
- Running time: 3 hours (2 × 1 & a half hours)
- Production company: Sky One Productions

Original release
- Network: Sky1
- Release: 30 May – 31 May 2010

Related
- Terry Pratchett's Hogfather; Terry Pratchett's The Colour of Magic

Terry Pratchett's Going Postal is a two-part television film adaptation of Going Postal by Terry Pratchett, adapted by Richard Kurti and Bev Doyle and produced by The Mob, which was first broadcast on Sky1, and in high definition on Sky1 HD, at the end of May 2010.

It is the third in a series of adaptations, following Terry Pratchett's Hogfather and Terry Pratchett's The Colour of Magic. It was announced as part of an investment of at least £10 million into adaptations of novels, including Chris Ryan's Strike Back and Skellig by David Almond. Filming began in May 2009 in Budapest. As is now traditional with The Mob's Discworld adaptations, several fans were invited to appear as extras.

== Plot ==
After years of undertaking confidence tricks, Moist von Lipwig is caught by the Ankh-Morpork City Watch, and is sentenced to death under his current alias, Albert Spangler. Moist is hanged by the neck, but not killed. He is brought before Patrician Havelock Vetinari who gives Moist the choice to either become the new Postmaster or be executed by falling down a deep pit.

Moist immediately attempts to escape but is caught by his parole officer Mr Pump, a golem, and brought to the rundown post office where he meets his two staff: the elderly Junior Postman Tolliver Groat and his assistant, the pin-obsessed Stanley Howler. Moist learns from Reacher Gilt, the unscrupulous owner of the Clacks, an optical telegraph system that has supplanted the post office, that the four previous Postmasters had died in office.

Realizing he can never escape the relentless Mr. Pump, Moist visits the Golem Trust to help understand how golems are created and controlled. There he meets Adora Belle Dearheart for whom he begins to develop feelings. His con man skills prove to be useful in making the post office popular again—he invents the postage stamp in an attempt to raise money and improve efficiency and convenience, starts an express post service to neighbouring cities and hires every available golem in the city to supplement his workforce.

While staying in the post office Moist begins to have visions which show him that some of his confidence tricks led to tragedies for those he conned, which cause him to experience feelings of remorse for the first time. These feelings are heightened when he discovers that Adora Belle's father Robert Dearheart was indirectly a victim of one of his cons, and as a result lost ownership of his invention, the Clacks. Moist confesses his past misdeeds to Adora Belle just as the post office is set afire. Moist sets his own safety aside and runs into the burning building to rescue Stanley Howler. Before finding Stanley, he is attacked by Mr Gryle, a banshee assassin who confesses that he killed the previous four Postmasters on behalf of Gilt. Just as Gryle is about to strike, Moist calls on the haunted letters in the post office to stop Gryle, which they do.

The burning of the post office means that the people of Ankh-Morpork are turning back to the Clacks for sending their messages, so Moist comes up with a plan to draw people back to the post office by pretending that he has experienced a vision telling him where the gods have buried money to help repair the post office (in reality the money was a hidden stash from his past cons). After this public success, Moist announces a new long distance delivery service.

Meanwhile, Adora Belle Dearheart is working on a way to jam up the Clacks with the help of a group of hackers (clacks-crackers) called "The Smoking Gnu" which they succeed in doing temporarily. The Clacks' chief engineer, Mr Pony, finds a way of preventing the jamming process, but after hearing Gilt murder his accountant Mr Horsefry, he presents Adora with evidence to prove that Gilt had the past four postmasters, as well as Adora's brother, killed.

When a second attempt to jam the Clacks fails Moist challenges Gilt to a race to Überwald between the Clacks versus post office. The message to be sent is a biography of Havelock Vetinari. Moist and Adora employ a disused Clack tower to intercept and secretly change the message from the biography to the content of Gilt's ledgers, providing evidence of the hired murders, which is witnessed in Ankh-Morpork. Gilt flees before he can be arrested; Adora is made manager of the Clacks and begins a relationship with Moist.

At the end of the story Gilt, having been tracked down by a Golem the same way Moist was, awakes in Vetinari's office. The Patrician asks Gilt if he knows anything about angels, and gives him an offer similar to one given earlier to Moist. When a postman (played by Terry Pratchett) later arrives at Vetinari's palace to deliver a letter to Gilt, Vetinari implies that Gilt killed himself by falling down the deep pit.

In a post-credits sequence, Groat and Stanley are sore and exhausted after making the round-trip to Überwald with a mail coach, but excited because they bet on Moist to win the race at odds of 50-1. Then Groat remembers that he left the betting slip in Überwald, so they immediately set off again in the desperate hope of finding it.

== Cast ==
- Richard Coyle as Moist von Lipwig
- David Suchet as Reacher Gilt
- Charles Dance as Patrician Havelock Vetinari
- Claire Foy as Adora Belle Dearheart
- Nicholas Farrell as Mr Pump (voice)
- Marnix Van Den Broeke as Mr Pump (body)
- Jimmy Yuill as Mr Spools
- Steve Pemberton as Drumknott
- Andrew Sachs as Tolliver Groat
- Tamsin Greig as Miss Cripslock
- Ingrid Bolsø Berdal as Sgt Angua
- Adrian Schiller as Mr Gryle
- Ian Bonar as Stanley Howler
- Madhav Sharma as Horsefry
- Timothy West as Mustrum Ridcully
- Sir Terry Pratchett as Postman
- Ben Crompton as Mad Al

== US Release ==
Both episodes of the miniseries were released on one DVD in the United States on 11 September 2011.
