= Raising Steam =

2013 Discworld novel by Terry Pratchett

- First edition
- Author: Terry Pratchett
- Cover artist: Paul Kidby
- Language: English
- Series: Discworld; 40th novel – 3rd Moist von Lipwig story
- Subject: Steam engines, Fundamentalism; Characters: Moist von Lipwig; Locations: Ankh-Morpork
- Genre: Fantasy
- Publisher: Doubleday
- Publication date: 7 November 2013 (18 Mar 2014, U.S.)
- Pages: 384
- ISBN: 978-0-85752-227-6
- Preceded by: Snuff
- Followed by: The Shepherd's Crown

Raising Steam is the 40th Discworld novel, written by Terry Pratchett. It was the penultimate one, published before his death in 2015. Originally due to be published on 24 October 2013, it was pushed back to 7 November 2013 (and March 18, 2014 in the U.S.). It stars Moist von Lipwig, and features the introduction of locomotives to the Discworld (a concept mentioned already in Death's Domain), and introduces Dick Simnel as a new character.

The cover of the novel was exclusively revealed on Pratchett's Facebook page on 6 August 2013.

An update to Pratchett's website late October 2013 revealed that characters include Harry King, Moist von Lipwig, Adora Belle Dearheart, Sgt Fred Colon, and others.

== Plot synopsis ==
Dick Simnel, a young self-taught engineer from Sto Lat (and whose father, Ned Simnel, appeared in Reaper Man), has invented a steam locomotive. He brings his invention to Ankh-Morpork where it catches the interest of Sir Harry King, a millionaire businessman who has made his fortune in the waste and sanitation industry, as he wishes to create a legacy disassociated from the source of his wealth. Harry promises Dick sufficient investment to make the railway a success.

The Patrician of Ankh-Morpork, Lord Vetinari, wishing to ensure that the City has appropriate influence over the new enterprise, appoints the reformed fraudster turned civil servant Moist von Lipwig to represent the government in the management of the railway. His skills soon come in useful in negotiations with landowners along the route of the new line.

Throughout the story, Dwarfish fundamentalists are responsible for a number of terrorist attacks against the new Ankh-Morpork railway, including murder and arson. This campaign culminates in a palace coup in Uberwald, while the King is at an international summit in Quirm, over twelve hundred miles away. Vetinari declares that it is imperative to return the King to Schmaltzberg as soon as possible in order to restore political stability, and gives Moist the task of getting him there via the new railway. Moist protests impossibility on the grounds that the railway is nowhere near complete, but is told that achieving this target is non-negotiable.

On the journey there are numerous attacks by Dwarfish fundamentalists, but eventually the train reaches its destination and the King retakes Schmaltzberg with little resistance. The king then reveals that she is in fact female and is therefore the Low Queen, because all dwarves traditionally adopt a male guise. As a movement during the disc world series has some dwarfs, believing that this is old fashioned showing that they are female. This is essentially the climax of this movement, with the dwarf's king turned queen essentially endorsing this movement

Back in Ankh-Morpork, there are honours and medals all round except for Moist who is told that his reward is to remain alive.

== Characters ==
- Dick Simnel – inventor of Iron Girder, Discworld's first steam train (Discworld's answer to Roundworld's Richard Trevithick).
- Lord Vetinari – Patrician of Ankh-Morpork
- Moist von Lipwig
- Harry King
- Low King/Queen Rhys Rhysson
- Adora Belle von Lipwig
- Samuel Vimes
- Of the Twilight, the Darkness - Goblin

== Reception ==
Science fiction author Cory Doctorow in his review on Boing Boing remarked that Pratchett "never quite balanced whimsy and gravitas as carefully as this, and it works beautifully. This is a spectacular novel, and a gift from a beloved writer to his millions of fans."

Ben Aaronovitch for The Guardian noted that while Raising Steam may be "heavy-handed" in its moralising, Pratchett "can be forgiven" because he remains one of the most consistently funny writers in the business.

Sara Sklaroff for The Washington Post praised Pratchett's innate ability to balance the silly and the serious. Pratchett "blasts fundamentalists who resist all progress", but mostly he seems to be "having fun with words in the very British strain of absurdist humor."

Karin L Kross for Tor.com praised Raising Steam as "the latest transformation of a remarkable fictional world that has evolved and grown with its creator."

Reading order guide
Preceded by Snuff	40th Discworld Novel	Succeeded by The Shepherd's Crown
Preceded by Making Money	3rd Moist von Lipwig story Published in 2013	Succeeded by None
