= The Whistleblowers =

- Genre: Crime drama
- Written by: Tony Marchant; Paul Logue; Steve Thompson
- Directed by: Richard Clark; Paul Gay; John McKay
- Starring: Richard Coyle; Indira Varma; Daniel Ryan
- Country of origin: United Kingdom
- Original language: English
- No. of series: 1
- No. of episodes: 6

Production
- Executive producers: Tony Marchant; Gareth Neame
- Producer: Sanne Wohlenberg
- Production location: United Kingdom
- Running time: 60 minutes
- Production company: Carnival Films

Original release
- Network: ITV
- Release: 27 September – 1 November 2007

The Whistleblowers is a British drama series, first broadcast on ITV from 27 September to 1 November 2007. The series stars Richard Coyle and Indira Varma as personal injury lawyers Ben Graham and Alisha Cole, who set themselves up in private practice after witnessing a covert team of police officers kidnapping a suspect in broad daylight. Described as ITV's answer to Hustle and Spooks, only one series of the programme was broadcast, before it was axed by the network. A DVD of the series was subsequently released on 12 November 2007.

== Critical reception ==
Gerard O'Donovan of The Telegraph said of the opening episode: "ITV has been looking for a rival to BBC One’s glossy hits Hustle and Spooks for some time now. The Whistleblowers, a drama series about a pair of toothsome young lawyers wielding the twin swords of truth and justice to expose corporate and government corruption, was commissioned with that in mind. And with the likes of scriptwriter Tony Marchant at the helm and the likeable Richard Coyle and Indira Varma in the lead roles, ITV must have felt they were onto a winner. For last night’s opener to get off to a great start only to ebb away into cliché and numbskullery was, therefore, more than usually disappointing. The characters were well set up. Ben (Coyle) and Alisha (Varma) were lawyers working for the same City firm. He was the cut and run merchant, she the cautious high-flyer. Driving home one night they came across a half-naked hooded man being bundled into a Range Rover by big chaps in Army fatigues, so they did what any self-respecting lawyers would do – they backed off. So far so good, but unfortunately their lives then became a morass of unlikely coincidences and unlawyer-like behaviour.

The hooded man conveniently turned up again in the house opposite their flat and the big chaps left the curtains open while indulging in a spot of torture. Not only that, they left the front door open while signing for a delivery, allowing Ben to sneak in and find a very articulate terrorist suspect in the basement. “I’m being held by rogue British security agents. It’s a big conspiracy. Can you call my campaigning lawyer for me,” only mildly paraphrases his actual words. Suffice to say that the bad guys were defeated and our dynamic duo, having run the gamut of MI5 nastiness, emerged grinning like Cheshire cats, announcing to a breathless media scrum that they were founding an agency for fellow lid-lifters in need of white knights. After that start, I wouldn’t trust them to challenge a parking ticket. But there are five more episodes to come. Let’s hope they’re more convincing."

== Cast ==
- Richard Coyle as Ben Graham
- Indira Varma as Alisha Cole
- Daniel Ryan as Kenny Reed
- Paul Freeman as Joseph Cole

== Episodes ==
No.	Title	Directed by	Written by	Original release date	Viewers (millions)
1	"Ghosts"	John McKay	Tony Marchant	27 September 2007	3.93
Ben Graham and Alisha Cole are successful personal injury lawyers. When Ben sees a half-naked man forced into a vehicle and then into a nearby flat he does the right thing and calls the police. The police, however, are not really interested in investigating the incident. When Ben and Alisha try to investigate the matter themselves, there seems to a campaign to muzzle them. Ben and Alisha realize that if they are going to succeed in speaking out, they will need to gather irrefutable proof.
2	"Pandemic"	John McKay	Tony Marchant	4 October 2007	TBA
Ben Graham and Alisha Cole have now set themselves up in private practice, but business is quite slow. When there is a new outbreak of the corona x virus, they suspect that a pharmaceutical firm is trying to create panic in order to sell a possible vaccine. Ben and Alisha then try to convince a company scientist to go public with the truth.
3	"No Child Left Behind"	Paul Gay	Steve Thompson	11 October 2007	TBA
Alisha and Ben are approached by a teacher who claims that a teenage student's recent suicide can be traced to a lack of discipline at the school. Their resulting investigation uncovers what seems to be a campaign to tarnish the school's reputation and a scandal involving government subsidies.
4	"Fit for Purpose"	Paul Gay	Tony Saint	18 October 2007	TBA
Alisha and Ben uncover corruption in the immigration service that allowed a person to enter the country illegally for the purpose of committing a murder.
5	"Starters"	Richard Clark	Paul Logue	25 October 2007	TBA
Alisha and Ben are asked to investigate Griffin Distillers in relation to claims that it is deliberately marketing alcoholic beverages to 11-15 year olds. As they look into the case they uncover some interesting facts about Griffin and a rehabilitation center for underage alcoholics.
6	"Environment"	Richard Clark	Tony Marchant	1 November 2007	TBA
Ben and Alisha receive an anonymous tip that a major waste disposal company may be breaking environmental laws. The company specializes in incinerating waste but they may be dumping the ash inappropriately resulting in pollution that could be cancer-causing.
