= The Mob (company) =

British film production company

The Mob is a British media production company.

In 2008, The Mob shifted their headquarter from Leeds to Manchester.

In 2012, Red Arrow Entertainment Group bought a majority interest in The Mob.

== Productions ==
- Terry Pratchett's Hogfather (2006 2-part television production)
- Terry Pratchett's The Colour of Magic (2008 2-part television production)
- Terry Pratchett's Going Postal (2010 2-part television production)
