= Dead Man's Shoes =

Dead Man's Shoes is a British saying referring to promotion to a position that is only attainable by the current holder's death.

Dead Man's Shoes may also refer to:

- Dead Man's Shoes (1940 film), a British drama film directed by Thomas Bentley
- Dead Man's Shoes (2004 film), a British psychological thriller film
- Dead Man's Shoes (FM album), 1995
- Dead Man's Shoes (Lucky Bullets album), 2012
- "Dead Man's Shoes" (The Twilight Zone), a 1962 episode of the American television anthology series The Twilight Zone
- "Dead Man's Shoes", a 1967 episode of the British television private eye thriller series Man in a Suitcase
