= List of Discworld characters =

This article contains brief biographies for prominent characters from Terry Pratchett's Discworld series. More central characters' biographies are also listed in articles relating to the organisations they belong to, main characters have their own articles.

Characters are listed alphabetically by name and/or group.

== 71-Hour Ahmed ==
A Klatchian warrior and bodyguard who accompanies his Prince, Khufurah, an envoy on a diplomatic mission from Klatch to Ankh-Morpork in the 21st Discworld novel, Jingo. Ahmed belongs to a formidable but honourable warrior clan called the D'regs. Speaking purposefully with a heavy accent and chewing cloves he is suspected of killing the Watch's prime suspect in a botched assassination attempt on the prince; provoking Vimes and the Watch to pursue Ahmed back to Klatch.

Ahmed got his nickname by killing a man guilty of poisoning a well, one hour before the cultural D'reg three days of unwavering hospitality allowed; a time during which even great enemies should be shown respect. He is later revealed to be the Wali of Klatch, equivalent to Vimes's position as Commander of the City Watch. Ahmed and Vimes eventually develop a wary respect for each other as basically honest cops in unenviable positions.

== Ankh-Morpork ==
A character in itself, Ankh-Morpork is the largest city on the Disc with 1 million inhabitants, and a common location for many of the Discworld's stories. Its nickname is "the Big Wahoonie" (an ugly, smelly fruit). Originally two cities separated by a river, Ankh and Morpork today are governed as one city-state. Ankh-Morpork contains the Assassin's guild, the Unseen University and the City Watch amongst many other famous Discworld institutions. Many of its denizens appear sporadically through the series in the novels set in the city.

=== Ankh-Morpork City Watch ===
The Ankh-Morpork Watch, simply known as just "The Watch", is Ankh-Morpork's police force. Prominent members being;

- Sam Vimes
- Captain Carrot
- Angua
- Sergeant Fred Colon
- Corporal Nobby Nobbs

=== Notable residents ===
- The Canting Crew, a group of beggars who are too anarchic for the Beggars' Guild, including; Foul Ole Ron, Altogether Andrews, Coffin Henry, The Duck Man and Arnold Sideways.
- Cut-Me-Own-Throat Dibbler
- Doughnut Jimmy, a horse doctor that treats humans.
- Mr Hong, a part of Ankh-Morpork's collective memory.
- Willie Hobson, who runs Hobson's Livery Stable.

== The Auditors of Reality ==
The Auditors of Reality are formless non-beings housed under grey cloaks with no distinguishing marks. Auditors do not speak; they re-arrange the world as they wish to express without words being uttered. Auditors are neutral, devoid of emotion but are opposed to the chaotic morass of emotions of humanity. This is because humanity is messy and upsets the logically reasoned order of the universe; by which the Auditors feel the universe should be run without let or hindrance.

Auditors appear in eleventh Discworld novel, Reaper Man, attempting to replace Death with a more amenable professional, with less of an identity and personality. The Auditors choose to remain at odds with Death as he champions the concepts of identity, individuality and personality, which remain alien to the Auditors. Any Auditors who start to exhibit expressions of individuality are instantaneously disintegrated into non-existence and immediately replaced by a new identical facsimile. Auditors are supposedly of one mind, always acting in concert with unanimity, but as more interaction with reality occurs this unison gradually and inevitably breaks down as disagreement, bickering, creativity and jealousy formulate, with Auditors developing consciousness. A notable example of an Auditor going through the process of anthropopathism is Myria LeJean, (myriad and legion), who appears in the 26th Discworld novel, Thief of Time, who rebels against the Auditors in their mission to destroy humanity.

The 'greyness' of the Auditors may be a nod to The Grey Men of the novel Momo and its similar paranormal entities.

== Mavolio Bent ==
The Head Cashier and all but in charge of the Royal Bank of Ankh-Morpork, makes his first appearance in the 36th Discworld novel, Making Money. Mr Bent has been employed at the bank since he was thirteen, when he came to the city with a group of travelling accountants. He was born as a clown, but his first time performing the audience laughing at him caused him to flee and join a group of travelling accountants, discovering his talent for numbers.

Mavolio Bent's history bears a passing resemblance to that of John Major who was born the son of a music hall performer, but left to join a bank, eventually becoming Prime Minister of the UK, 1990–1997. Andrew Rawnsley said that he "ran away from the circus to join a troupe of accountants".

== Lieutenant Blouse ==
Polly Perks's platoon commander in 31st Discworld novel, Monstrous Regiment, Blouse is an effeminate aristocrat who was promoted from administrator in the Quartermaster-General's Blanket, Bedding, and Horse Fodder Department to field command with no previous experience, thanks to Borogravia's rapidly diminishing supply of combat-ready men.

Blouse's ambition to have an item of clothing or a food named after him, following in the tradition of famous military men, is eventually fulfilled when a fingerless glove is given his name. Blouse's talent for mathematics and technology propel him to success despite a feminine manner and lack of martial prowess signalling a change in Discworld warfare as intelligence and technology begin to replace bravery and fighting skill. Blouse comes to respect the women serving under him.

== Brutha ==
Brutha is an Omnian novice at the Citadel in the capital city of Kom in the 13th Discworld novel, Small Gods. Omnia is an autocratic theocracy that believes in the existence of only one God, The Great God Om. Brutha is a dutiful and truly faithful lad; his devotion being instilled from infancy by being raised by his piously strict grandmother. Brutha is word-perfect on Omnian religious texts thanks to his eidetic memory but unable to read or write. By virtue of his memory, Brutha retains all conversations and moments from the day of his birth.

Brutha finds a one-eyed tortoise in the soft soil of his melon patch, the tortoise is actually the Great God Om afflicted with temporary amnesia, which recedes in the presence of Brutha. Brutha is the sole remaining true believer of Om as all other Omnians have unknowingly shifted their belief to the structure of the church itself, leaving Om with almost no godly powers, resulting in his earthly manifestation into a tortoise with memory loss instead of a rampaging giant bull.

Brutha comes to the attention of Deacon Vorbis, the Chief Exquistor in charge of the Quisition, who intends to use Brutha's amazing memory to invade and occupy the neighbouring country of Ephebe and propel himself to head of the Omnian church. Brutha foils Vorbis's plans, restores Om's godly powers, resolves the conflict between Omnia and the other nations on the Klatchian coast and becomes the Cenobiarch and the Eighth Prophet of the Church. He reforms the Church into a "constitutional religion", one where even Om has to obey his own commandments. Brutha fills his time as Cenobiarch by copying all of the lost works from the Great Library of Ephebe fire that had occurred during the Omnian occupation of Ephebe.

== Seldom Bucket ==
Seldom Bucket was a big man in cheese production in Ankh-Morpork, who just prior to the events in Maskerade, purchases the Ankh-Morpork Opera House. Seldom believes he can make money from opera like he can from cheese, he becomes horrified to learn how expensive opera is, and it is in fact a money pit. This becomes exacerbated by the slew of strange murders being committed by the 'Opera Ghost', causing Seldom to rethink his purchase.

== Carcer ==
Carcer (from the Italian: Carcere) is the psychopathic villain of 29th Discworld novel, Night Watch, described by Vimes as "a stone-cold killer. With brains". His full name is revealed in a preview of Night Watch but not in the completed novel, as Carcer Dun.

Carcer has a talent for unnerving people, an annoying laugh and a perpetual conviction of his own innocence despite his many crimes, which include at least two murders. Carcer claims his original crime was stealing a loaf of bread although, Vimes says, Carcer would have murdered the baker and stolen the whole bakery.

Following a rooftop chase across Unseen University in a magical thunderstorm, both Carcer and Vimes are transported thirty years into the past, about a week before the Glorious Revolution of the Twenty-Fifth of May. Carcer immediately murders Pseudopolitan watchman John Keel and joins Lord Winder's secret police force, the Cable Street Particulars (also known as the Unmentionables), quickly climbing through their ranks to become a sergeant. Ultimately, Carcer is returned to the present day and arrested by Vimes.

== Imp Y Celyn ==
In the 16th Discworld novel, Soul Music, Imp Y Celyn (Welsh: [ɪmp ə ˈkɛlɨ̞n], lit. 'Bud of the holly', a pun on "Buddy Holly") is a bard from the mountainous country of Llamedos who is possessed by "Music with Rocks in" and becomes the Disc's greatest musician under the name Buddy, people comment on him appearing a little "elvish". Buddy founds the Band with Rocks In, along with Cliff and Glod. The band tries to adhere to the hedonistic rock'n'roll stereotypical lifestyle of 'live fast and die young,' as they tour the Disc to the new fans of this music. An intervention by Death leads to a timeline change, where the music ends and Imp may have been seen working in a fried-fish stall in Quirm, a reference to Kirsty MacColl's song "There's a Guy Works Down the Chip Shop Swears He's Elvis".

== Christine ==
Christine is a pretty, thin, blonde chorus singer at the Ankh-Morpork Opera House, in the 18th Discworld novel, Maskerade, who wears white and uses exclamation marks at the end of every sentence. She is an extraordinarily untalented singer in an inverse proportion to her beauty, but she has 'star talent'. The Opera House management promotes Christine because of her beauty and because her father helped finance the purchase of the Ankh-Morpork Opera House. Christine performs onstage by lip-syncing to the voice of Agnes Nitt who remains backstage. Christine's father once told her that a "dear little pixie" would help her career and she thinks that Agnes might be that pixie.

== Roland de Chumsfanleigh ==
Roland de Chumsfanleigh — pronounced 'de Chuffley', which, as Pratchett says, is not his fault — is the son of the Baron of the Chalkland. Roland is introduced as a 12-year-old in the 30th Discworld novel, The Wee Free Men, the first novel in the Tiffany Aching series. A dull-witted child, Roland is kidnapped and held by the Queen of the Elves for a year, eventually being freed by Tiffany.

In Wintersmith, now a young man Roland is recruited by the Nac Mac Feegle to perform the role of the mythic Hero in the Dance of the Seasons, to fix the damage done by Tiffany and the Wintersmith.

In I Shall Wear Midnight, the fourth book in the series, Roland marries Letitia Keepsake, a good-natured, pampered aristocrat.

== Cohen the Barbarian ==
Ghenghiz Cohen, known as Cohen the Barbarian, is a hero in the classical sense, that is, a professional thief, brawler and ravisher of women. Cohen is introduced in the second Discworld novel, The Light Fantastic, and returns prominently in Interesting Times and The Last Hero. Cohen is the Discworld's greatest warrior hero, renowned for rescuing maidens, destroying mad high priests of dark cults, looting ancient ruins, and so on. Cohen first appears already as a toothless sinewy old man, with a long white beard that reaches below his loincloth and with a patch over one eye — "a lifetime in his own legend" — but still tough enough to handle anything, as to survive to such an age one must be very good as a barbarian indeed. Cohen supposes he might be between 90 and 95, before acquiring a set of diamond dentures made of troll teeth.

Cohen has outlived the heroic age and finds himself in a world where great battles and astonishing rescues rarely happen except in stories, one of the last being Troll Bridge where Cohen and a troll reminisce about the good old days when everyone respected tradition.

In Interesting Times Cohen becomes Emperor of the Agatean Empire by right of conquest with the aid of the Silver Horde, a small team comprising similarly elderly heroes and former teacher Ronald Saveloy. However, he soon becomes bored and invades the home of the Gods in The Last Hero, by "returning fire to the gods, with interest". Cohen is last seen stealing horses belonging to the Valkyries and riding into the sky, to explore space.

Cohen's name and character may be a literary echo of Robert E. Howard's character Conan the Barbarian and Genghis Khan, combined with the Jewish surname Cohen, because he can bring you "wholesale slaughter".

Cohen boasts of fathering dozens of children over his long life, but only one is introduced — Conina, who appears in Sourcery.

== Conina ==
Conina is the daughter of Cohen the Barbarian and a temple dancer, introduced in the fifth Discworld novel, Sourcery. Described as both a well-endowed, beautiful, and a skilled fighter due to attributes inherited from both parents, she nonetheless aspires to be a hairdresser, despite her natural talents as a barbarian heroine, where her genetics keep getting in the way, so she instinctively kills people who threaten her. Conina falls in love with Nijel the Destroyer, a clerk with the talents and physique to match who, despite having no aptitude for it, desperately wants to be a barbarian hero.

== Mrs Marietta Cosmopilite ==
Mrs Cosmopilite is a dressmaker, who first appears in 10th Discworld novel, Moving Pictures as 'Vice-President' of Costuming and Theda Withel's landlady. Mrs Cosmopilite holds some individualistic ideas; amongst them she believes the Disc is under threat from inhuman monsters, that the world is round and that three dwarfs look in on her undressing every night.

Mrs Cosmopilite known to be venerated by the History Monks, who know that knowledge is greater if it comes from further away. This reverence might be attributed to Lu-Tze, a former lodger of Mrs Cosmopilite. Lu-Tze wrote down many of Marietta's working class aphorisms as guides by which to live life. The sayings serving dual purpose of stereotypical utterances of an older working-class woman and pieces of oriental wisdom. An example being, "I wasn't born yesterday" which, as Lu Tze points out, resembles one of the key revelations of Wen the Eternally Surprised, who, in reference to the continually destroyed and renewed nature of the universe, and the constancy of revelation, said "I was not born-yesterday!".

== Sacharissa Cripslock ==
Miss Sacharissa Cripslock is the reporter for the Ankh-Morpork Times appearing in the 25th Discworld novel The Truth and subsequent novels, having originally arrived at the print-works to complain about the invention of moveable type putting her grandfather, an engraver, out of a job.

Sacharissa combines her buxom qualities, talent for asking devious questions, ability to think in headlines and her editorial skills to be a skilful roving reporter.

== Adora Belle Dearheart ==
Adora Belle Dearheart is a cynical, angry chain-smoker. Her father Robert Dearheart, founded the Grand Trunk Semaphore Company and was conned out of it by Reacher Gilt. Forced into employment, Adora obtains a post at the Golem Trust, an organisation that seeks to liberate golems from slavery. Appearing first in 33rd Discworld novel, Going Postal, Adora starts a tentative relationship with Moist von Lipwig, filled with Tracy and Hepburn-style combative banter. Intelligent and intuitive, Adora can easily see through Moist's schemes. Out of fondness, she allows him to call her Spike. Adora wears what she claims are "the pointiest heels in the world" which she uses to deal with unwelcome advances.

== Death (& extended family) ==
Death is the Disc's version of the Grim Reaper. He appears in every Discworld novel except for The Wee Free Men and Snuff.

- Mort - Death's one-time apprentice and son-in-law.
- Ysabell - Death's adopted daughter.
- Susan Sto Helit - Death's granddaughter.
- Albert - Death's manservant/valet.
- The Death of Rats - The Death of Rats.

== Cut-Me-Own-Throat Dibbler ==
Claude Maximillian Overton Transpire Dibbler — usually known by the epithet "Cut-Me-Own-Throat", CMOT Dibbler, or simply Dibbler, or even sometimes as just "Throat" — might be described as the Discworld's most enterprisingly successful unsuccessful entrepreneur, no-one has failed at success more times than Dibbler. A 'merchant venturer' of Ankh-Morpork, and the master of selling the 'sizzle' over the steak, Dibbler is most famous for selling meat by-products to unsuspecting passers-by, and also suspecting passers-by who have gotten sick from his sausages before, thus demonstrating that he is indeed a very good salesman.

CMOT's nickname originates from his catchphrase "... and at that price, I'm cutting me own throat". Dibbler has been described as looking like a rodent wearing long 'poacher's' coat covered in pockets, he is usually seen either carrying a tray or, in financially better times, pushing a barrow.

Dibbler for a time ran a mail-order service, including but not limited to 'fong shooey' advice, 'Grand Master Lobsang Dibbler' martial-arts lessons, Dibbler's Genuine Soggy Mountain Dew gin, souvenir snow-globes, and advertising space in the Ankh-Morpork Times. Dibbler has branched out becoming at times:

- a moving pictures producer/director
- a music agent for a 'Music with Rocks In' group
- an editor of the Ankh-Morpork Inquirer — a tabloid published by the Guild of Engravers — for which he fabricated news stories.

When Dibbler's businesses (inevitably) fail, he falls back on selling 'pies (named meat for extra cost) with personality' and 'pig' sausages-inna-bun, where the sausages contain parts that might have been near a pig if you're lucky.

Dibbler's nickname might be a temporal paradox suggested by a time displaced Samuel Vimes. The wizard Rincewind postulates that equivalents of Dibbler are everywhere. This theory is borne out by the appearance of many versions of Dibbler throughout the Discworld series, some prominent ones being:

- Cut-Me-Own-Hand-Off Dhblah sold disturbingly live yogurt in Omnia (Small Gods). In the Discworld II computer game, his name is spelt D'blah and he gives secrets about pyramid power in Djelibeybi.
- Disembowel-Meself-Honourably Dibhala sold suspiciously fresh thousand-year eggs in the Agatean Empire (Interesting Times).
- Fair Go Dibbler sold the archetypal pie floaters on the lost continent of Fourecks (The Last Continent).

Others include:

- Al-Jiblah
- May-I-Never-Achieve-Enlightenment Dhiblang
- Dib Diblossonson
- May-I-Be-Kicked-In-My-Own-Ice-Hole Dibooki
- Swallow-Me-Own-Blowdart Dhlang-Dhlang
- Point-Me-Own-Bone Dibjla

Mentioned in The Science of Discworld, another Dibbler equivalent is Ratonasticthenes from Ephebe. It was previously thought they all might be related, but the Discworld Companion explains that this is parallel evolution. "Wherever people are prepared to eat terrible food," it says, "there will be someone there to sell it to them."

Dibbler appeared in the Cosgrove Hall animations of Soul Music and Wyrd Sisters, where his appearance was modelled on Private Walker, the spiv in Dad's Army.

A character named C!Mot is briefly mentioned in non-Discworld novel, The Also People, by Ben Aaronovitch. Aaronovitch has confirmed that C!Mot is intended as a parallel Dibbler. A character called 'Clap-Me-In-Irons Daoibleagh' appears in the webcomic Rogues of Clwyd-Rhan.

The Cretaceous conifer species Sulcatocladus dibbleri is named after CMOT Dibbler.

== Didactylos ==
Meaning "Two-Fingered" in Ephebian, Didactylos is a Disc philosopher who bears more than a passing resemblance to Diogenes the Cynic in the 13th Discworld novel, Small Gods. Didactylos lives in a barrel inside the wall of the palace of the Tyrant in Ephebe, crafting bespoke philosophies, axioms and aphorisms for scraps. Although Didactylos is one of the most popular philosophers on the Disc, Didactylos never earns the respect of his fellow philosophers, who say he thinks 'about the wrong things', his authorship of the scroll, De Chelonian Mobile, which contradicts Omnian dogma about the shape of the Discworld, was one catalyst in Vorbis' plans to annex Ephebe. A common motif for Didactylos is being pictured with a lantern though blind and looking for an "honest man". Didactylos is made an Omnian bishop by Brutha.

== Dragon King of Arms ==
Appearing in Feet of Clay, Dragon King of Arms is the vampire chief herald at the Royal College of Arms of Ankh-Morpork. He informs Sam Vimes that he is not entitled to a coat of arms due to his ancestor Suffer-Not-Injustice 'Stoneface' Vimes' executing Lorenzo the Kind, the last King of Ankh-Morpork, while at the same time proposing that Corporal Nobby Nobbs may be the heir to the Earldom of Ankh.

== Evil Harry Dread ==
Evil Harry Dread is the archetypal, villainous counterpart to Cohen the Barbarian; an old fashioned heroic fantasy type annoyed with how the Discworld has changed; such as modern heroes always blocking his escape tunnel before confronting him. Harry is proud of being a Dark Lord. Heroes don't bear him any grudges; he always lets them win and in return they always let him escape, the opposite of the modern Evil Overlord List. Evil Harry Dread follows the 'rules' by hiring stupid henchmen, investing in helmets that cover the whole face and placing heroes in overly contrived, easily escapable death-traps.

In the 27th Discworld novel, The Last Hero, Harry joins Cohen's gang, the Silver Horde on the quest to 'return fire to the gods' by blowing up the mountain. True to his villainous archetype, Harry betrays them. The Horde praise him for still being a reliable Dark Lord to the end.

== D'regs ==
The D'regs, a nomadic and warlike people who inhabit the desert regions of hubward Klatch. The D'regs are ferocious in battle, which they like to do and will attack anyone and anything, even themselves if bored, this can be put on hold in their tradition of hospitality similar to the ancient Greek law of xenia a guest will be cared for a duration of 72 hours, after that, all bets are off. Noted member 71-Hour Ahmed got his name by violating the 3-day custom, an act so unthinkable that other D'regs call him the most feared man in all of Klatch. Distrust is generally encouraged among the D'regs; Ahmed tells Vimes that his mother would be greatly offended if he trusted her, because she would then feel she had not brought him up right.

The 21st Discworld novel, Jingo, notes that 'D'reg' is a name given by others. It means 'enemy', in this case, everybody else's, the D'regs proudly adopted this. The D'regs share many similarities with the Tuareg people of the Sahara of North Africa.

== Rufus Drumknott ==
Secretary to Lord Vetinari, the Patrician of Ankh-Morpork, following the death of Lupine Wonse, he first appears in 15th Discworld novel, Men at Arms he commonly is seen entering and leaving the presence of the Patrician bearing either paperwork or verbal information on the activities of the denizens of the city, or the Disc in general. Drumknott is truly neutral and doesn't reflect on what his files contain, just that they are filed correctly.

William de Worde describes Drumknott as someone with "no discernible personality". In Unseen Academicals, Drumknott shows no love for football, but in Raising Steam, he develops a keen interest in the newly-emergent railway, wishing to spend more time aboard Iron Girder, the Discworld's first steam locomotive.

== Gaspode ==
Gaspode the Wonder Dog first appears in the tenth Discworld novel, Moving Pictures. Named for the Gaspode who faithfully stayed by his master's grave and whined, possibly because of having had his tail caught in the tombstone, he and a number of other animals gain self-awareness and the ability to speak when the Holy Wood Dream escapes, and is compelled to travel to Holy Wood to break into the nascent film industry. Gaspode becomes the agent for Victor Tugelbend and Laddie, winning them pay raises from CMOT Dibbler. Gaspode and Laddie blow up the Odium picture-throwing pit during the disrupted premiere of Blown Away to kill a creature from the Dungeon Dimensions, and destroy the portal created by the "click"; left for dead, he climbs out of the wreckage and reverts to a normal dog when the Holy Wood Dream ends.

In Men at Arms, Gaspode has regained his sapience and ability to speak after too much time sleeping by the High Energy Magic Building at Unseen University, he assists the Night Watch's investigation of a plot involving the Disc's first and only 'gonne'. Gaspode simultaneously resents canine subservience to humanity and yearns for masterly companionship, he is able to shout commands at dogs as would a human, much to his self-disgust. In Feet of Clay, Gaspode becomes Foul Ole Ron's Thinking Brain Dog and part of the Canting Crew. In The Fifth Elephant, Gaspode helps Captain Carrot to track Angua down after she flees back to her native Überwald, where he explores his innate lupine nature.

In The Truth, the existence of a talking dog has become a well-known urban myth along with the rightful King of Ankh-Morpork walking the streets of the city. Gaspode assists the newly created Ankh-Morpork Times's by becoming an informant called "Deep Bone".

== Reacher Gilt ==
Reacher Gilt appears in the 33rd Discworld novel, Going Postal, he is the head of a consortium of financiers who had been embezzling from the clacks network since it was set up, and who, when it reached the point of collapse, bought the original owners out with their own money.

A ruthless businessman with a piratical appearance; an eyepatch and a cockatoo that screams "twelve and a half percent!" (one eighth, as in "pieces of eight"), Reacher is a shameless con-artist and fraudster whose business style is akin to playing "find the lady with entire banks". Under Gilt's management, the clacks network became more profitable through a tunneling fraud, but less reliable. Gilt pushes the network to near ruination, making sure no rivals appear by having his hired assassin, Mr Gryle deal with them. Reacher believes one day he will replace Lord Vetinari. A self-proclaimed advocate of freedom of choice, Gilt states that despite the communications monopoly held by the Grand Trunk Company, consumers still had the freedom to hand-deliver messages in person if they did not want to use the clacks network.

== JHC Goatberger ==
JHC Goatberger is an Ankh-Morpork publisher whose company printed The Joye of Snacks by A Lancre Witch and the Ankh-Morpork Almanack. Mr Goatberger prints his Almanacks on thin paper, as many families keep old editions in their privies.

In the 18th Discworld novel, Maskerade, Goatberger makes a great deal of money from Nanny's book, and is surprised she wants some of it. He also appears in Nanny Ogg's Cookbook, in a series of memos drawn to seem pinned to some pages. These form a discussion about the book between him and his head printer, Thomas Cropper. After a previous experience with Nanny Ogg's writing he wants to avoid innuendo, but is not entirely successful. His nephew has a similar exchange with Cropper in the pages of The Discworld Almanak.

Goatberger's name is a play on Johannes Gutenberg, with his first initials deriving from a phrase referring to Jesus Christ.

== Tolliver Groat ==
Tolliver Groat is one of the two remaining employees of the Ankh-Morpork Post Office prior to Moist von Lipwig being made Postmaster in the 33rd Discworld novel, Going Postal. Tolliver is a "very old man" in a cheap (possibly sentient) wig; Groat had spent most of his career in the Post Office as a Junior Postman, since until von Lipwig's arrival none of the other Postmasters appointed by Lord Vetinari had survived long enough to promote him. Groat does not trust doctors, which is understandable as he lives in Ankh-Morpork (see Doughnut Jimmy), he instead treats himself with a variety of apparently dubious 'natural' home remedies, including concoctions made with sulfur or arsenic, and a poultice made of bread pudding.

Groat is a habitual speaker of Dimwell Arrhythmic rhyming slang, the only known rhyming slang in the universe that does not actually rhyme. Groat refers to his wig with, "It's all mine, you know, not a prunes", short for a "syrup of prunes" which in Dimwell slang means 'wig', in Cockney rhyming slang it's "syrup of figs." Tolliver eventually achieves promotion to acting-Postmaster General as Moist moves on to assume control of the Royal Bank of Ankh Morpork.

== Herrena the Henna-Haired Harridan ==
Herrena the Henna-Haired Harridan is an ex-opponent, rival and lover of Cohen. Too proud to be a seamstress, too intelligent to be a wife, Herrena took the only other profession then available for a woman with spirit and no discernible magical talent. Herenna is a barbarian heroine of the old school, alongside her compatriot Red Scharron, another heroine who might remind some of Red Sonja of Conan the Barbarian fame.

== Hodgesaargh ==
Official falconer at Lancre Castle, Hodgesaargh is not his actual name, no one knows his given name as whenever Hodgesaargh introduces himself his birds attack him remorselessly. ("Hello, my name is Hodges...ARRRRRGH").

Hodgesaargh first appears in the 14th Discworld novel, Lords and Ladies, where he survives an elvish invasion of Lancre castle, thanks to the deadly nature of his birds. The official Lancre ceremonial outfit of red and gold with a big floppy hat is supplemented with about three plasters for him. One of the more famous birds he breeds is the Wowhawk, or Lappet-faced Worrier, like a goshawk but being short-sighted, preferring to walk everywhere and faints at the sight of blood.

In Carpe Jugulum Hodgesaargh discovers a phoenix and becomes one of the few Discworld inhabitants to help Granny Weatherwax in a time of great need.

Hodgesaargh is based on a real-life keeper of birds of prey named Dave Hodges, who lives in Northamptonshire, and is the author of The Arts of Falconrie and Hawking.

== Stanley Howler ==
Stanley Howler is one of the two remaining employees of the Ankh-Morpork Post Office prior to Moist von Lipwig being made Postmaster in the 18th Discworld novel, Going Postal.

Raised by peas (no further explanation is given), Stanley has a tendency towards obsessive behaviour, coupled with violent incidents (his 'little moments') when under stress. He used to be one of the more obsessive of Ankh-Morpork's large number of pin collectors (called 'pinheads'), to the point that all the other collectors thought he was "a bit weird about pins". During Going Postal, Stanley witnesses the destruction of his pin collection, which fortunately coincides with the invention of the postage stamp, to which he now redirects his obsessive behaviour by becoming a stamp collector and philatelist.

Stanley Howler may be connected to Roundworld history via Stanley Gibbons, a company which publishes catalogues of stamps for collectors; the howler is a type of monkey, belonging to the same simian family as the gibbon.

== Hrun the Barbarian ==
In the first Discworld novel, The Colour of Magic, Hrun appears as the archetypal fantasy barbarian hero of yore: hulking and muscle-bound yet slow-witted, battle-prone, alcoholic, and fond of virgins. Hrun stole his magical talking sword, Kring, after a battle, but regrets it due to the sword's talkativeness.

Hrun meets Rincewind in the lair of Bel Shamharoth and helps him escape only to be caught by the Dragonriders of the Wyrmberg, led by the curvaceous Liessa Dragonbidder. Liessa needed Hrun to wrest rule of the Wyrmberg away from her undead father and powerful brothers so she could become queen. Hrun's payment would be her hand in marriage. Hrun successfully defeats Liessa's brothers with his bare hands and Liessa banishes them. Just as Liessa strips naked before Hrun to test his desire, Rincewind and Twoflower swoop in on a dragon and snatch Hrun flying away with him. Hrun is miffed at this but as Twoflower faints this causes the dragon to disappear which existed only through willpower. As all three passengers fall, Liessa catches Hrun with her own dragon flying back to the Wrymberg.

In Interesting Times, when Cohen the Barbarian contemplates the fates of other heroes, Caleb the Ripper mentions that Hrun has become a Sergeant of the Guard in an unspecified city (whereas others died violently through misadventure).

Hrun's name and physique may have some semblance of Thrud the Barbarian; also being from Chimeria, makes one think of Conan the Cimmerian.

== Sergeant-Major Jack Jackrum ==
A character in the 31st Discworld novel, Monstrous Regiment, Jack Jackrum is an immensely fat, hard-bitten Borogravian sergeant major with decades of military experience. He is known, either personally or by reputation, by practically every soldier in the Borogravian Army, and boasts that he is probably quite well known by the soldiers of the enemy armies too. Jackrum has, over the decades, been the sergeant in command of (or under) a number of young soldiers who then rose up to the Army's high command, and thus wields considerable influence. Such influence that Jackrum just about manages to stay one step ahead of his discharge papers which are constantly in pursuit of him via the army mail. Jackrum trains Polly Perks and the other recruits of the Monstrous Regiment, and although is constantly threatening to put them all on a fizzer, he gradually earns the respect of all the recruits.

It is possible that there are elements of Jack Jackrum that were influenced by Terry Pratchett's close friend, Bernard Pearson.

== Bloody Stupid Johnson ==
BS Johnson or Bergholdt Stuttley Johnson — better known by his epithet Bloody Stupid — is an inept engineer and landscape artist. Johnson's notoriety is founded from a single-minded approach to his craft, best described as 'demented'. BS Johnson created some of the Disc's most impressive, dangerous, and unusual works of architecture, art, and engineering: the Johnson Exploding Pagoda and a chiming sundial that explodes every other day around noon — this by-and-large is down to his blindness or lack of understanding of the fundamental units of measurement. His most famous housing project, Empirical Crescent, tends to drive residents insane. BS Johnson lies at one end of a spectrum where people like Leonard of Quirm sit at the other end, on the Disc BS is well remembered and thankfully long-deceased.

Bergholdt Stuttley Johnson is the Disc's version of Capability Brown with a little Isambard Kingdom Brunel.

== Princess Keli ==
'Kelirehenna' or Keli is the daughter of King Olerve the Bastard of the Sto Plains kingdom of Sto Lat, appearing in the fourth Discworld novel, Mort. Keli stands between Duke of Sto Helit and the throne of Sto Lat. During an assassination organised by the Duke she is saved by Mort by dint of Mort being temporarily in Death's job being unwilling to let the assassin kill her. This leads to awkwardness as the universe thinks Keli is dead but she herself knows different. Keli's reality conflicts with the rest of the world, Keli enlists Ignius Cutwell, a local wizard to help her speedily through her coronation as Queen before the opposing reality enveloping Sto Lat collapses completely. Death himself returns to his old job to resolve issues caused in his absence.

== Harry King ==
One of Ankh-Morpork's most successful businessmen, Mr Harry King first appears in the 25th Discworld novel, The Truth. Harry's career in Ankh-Morpork started as a mudlark, he moved onwards and upwards from there. Harry's core business is 'night soil' removal but he also does rubbish collection and recycling. Harry's basic philosophy is that there is nothing that someone will pay to have removed that someone else will not also pay to acquire. The sign outside the yard reads "King of the Golden River, Recycling Nature's Bounty." This replaced, at his wife's, Euphemia "Effie" King's ( a pet-name) insistence, the original: "H King, taking the piss since 1961." Harry King like most rich self-made men never forgets a debtor, and needs to take two baths just to elevate himself to the rank of dirty.

Harry keeps ferocious, ravenous guard dogs on his property, as when burglars break in, he does not have to feed the dogs. Eventually Harry King is knighted. After providing capital to build the "Ankh-Morpork and Sto Plains Hygienic Railway" King is raised to the peerage, making his full title, Lord Sir Harry King.

"King of the Golden River," as well as referring to King's primary income may also refer to the classic fairy tale of 1842 written by John Ruskin, which was written for Euphemia 'Effie' Gray. King might also be analogous to the King of the Silver River fairy

== Lavaeolus ==
The Discworld equivalent of Odysseus, Lavaeolus (meaning: Washer/Rinser of Winds) has the finest military mind in Klatch and realised that if there must be war, the aim should be to defeat the enemy as quickly and with as little bloodshed as possible; a notion few other military minds have been able to grasp. Lavaeolus became a hero by ending the Tsortean Wars, bribing a cleaner to show him a secret passage into the citadel of Tsort. Lavaeolus then undergoes a long and perilous journey home after the war.

== Dr John 'Mossy' Lawn ==
In a city full of quacks, Dr Lawn is one of the few skilled physicians and surgeons of Ankh-Morpork, he first appeared in the 29th Discworld novel, Night Watch, as a backstreet 'pox doctor' to seamstresses.

Dr Lawn trained in Klatch, where he learned techniques that other Morporkian surgeons distrust, but he keeps patients alive to pay the bill. He gave free treatment to those who needed it, including those who had been tortured by the Cable Street Particulars. Quiet, if a tad sarcastic, and almost unshockable, he deals with nursing staff by throwing a handful of chocolates one way and running in the other. Dr Lawn becomes the Chief Of Medicine at the newly built Lady Sybil Free Hospital, where he supervises the teaching of a new order of competent doctors. The Dr says that when he dies, he wants a bell on his gravestone so he can be free to not get up whenever people ring.

Dr Lawn may be based on an actual retired GP of the same name in West Yorkshire.

== Lewton ==
Lewton appears in the third Discworld computer game, Discworld Noir. Lewton was kicked out of the Ankh-Morpork City Watch for allegedly taking a bribe, and became the Disc's first private investigator, and the only one to pay his massive drinks tab.

Lewton's takes on a case from Carlotta Von Überwald which ultimately ends up with Lewton saving Ankh-Morpork from a giant god of destruction.

== Liessa Dragonlady ==
Liessa Dragonlady, is the leader of the dragon-riders of the Wyrmberg and daughter of its lord, appearing in the first Discworld novel, The Colour of Magic. Liessa is the archetypal fantasy barbarian woman, she has curves and chestnut-red hair, and wears almost nothing but a chain-mail harness.

After successfully poisoning her father, the traditional mode of transfer of power in her family, Liessa still cannot become Lord of the Wyrmberg as a woman and faces intense rivalry from her two brothers. However any man who she marries would become Lord of the Wyrmberg. Rincewind, Twoflower, and Hrun the Barbarian pass nearby. In Hrun, Liessa sees a strong but slow-witted warrior whom she can control, she tests him by trying to stab him in his sleep, but Hrun survives. Liessa convinces Hrun to defeat her brothers, whom she then banishes.

== Trevor Likely ==
Trev is a worker at the Unseen University, tending to its candles, though his head is elsewhere, as he prefers to kick a tin can around, something at which he has gained an almost magical proficiency. Outside of work, he is a supporter of the Dimwell mob ball team (also known as "The Dimmers"). Although seemingly destined for the game of football, Trev refuses to play, promising his Mum he would not, after his father, Dave Likely, the only player to score four goals in a career, died during a game. Encountering the statuesque Juliet Stollop, he agrees to coach the university's team, the Unseen Academicals.

== Moist von Lipwig ==
The Postmaster General of Ankh-Morpork's Post Office, owner of the Chairman of the Bank of Ankh-Morpork, Master of the Royal Mint and perhaps a "reformed" con-man.

== Lobsang Ludd ==
Appearing in the 26th Discworld novel, Thief of Time, Lobsang Ludd was raised by the Ankh-Morpork Thieves' guild, but discovered by the History Monks after Lobsang instinctually performed the Stance of the Coyote, as he fell from a roof thus saving his own life from a fatal fall.

Lobsang is sent to the Temple of History monks to be educated. He confounds his teachers by knowing too much already without knowing how he knows it, and more than them. This leads Lobsang being apprenticed to Lu-Tze in the hope they would "break one another."

Lu-Tze theorises that time's hold on Lobsang was 'loose', allowing him to experience time differently from other humans. Lu-Tze and Lobsang travel to Ankh-Morpork to learn the Way of Mrs Cosmopilite. As they travel to Ankh-Morpork, Lobsang's soul-twin, Jeremy Clockson constructs a glass clock which will stop time. As time stops, Lobsang is able to still move, he meets and teams up with Susan Sto Helit to stop the Clock. Lobsang encounters Jeremy and they both realise they are the offspring of the personification of Time.

== Lu-Tze ==
Lu-Tze first appears in the 13th Discworld novel, Small Gods.

People, to whom Lu-Tze was a vaguely glimpsed figure behind a very slow broom, would have been surprised at his turn of speed, especially in a man six thousand years old, who ate nothing but brown rice and drank only green tea with a knob of rancid butter in it.

Lu-Tze (sometimes called by the nickname, Lousy) is usually seen with a broom in hand, which he uses for his main activity, sweeping, as he travels the Disc making sure 'history happens the way it ought to.' Or the way he thinks it should go, just because. Lu-Tze is a 'sweeper' at the Monastery of Oi-Dong in the Ramtop mountains, the home of the History Monks, he did start off training to be a monk, but didn't finish and became a sweeper instead, listening to the teaching going on around him as swept the classrooms. Lu-Tze finds that sweeping practically makes people invisible and has learned much about the world as he moves through it, sweeping.

For times when sweeping isn't enough, he is a master of (the only one known) 'déjà fu', a martial art where the body moves in time as well as space. This has led to the rule, 'Rule One', which states "Do not act incautiously when confronting little bald wrinkly smiling men", since such a person is almost always a highly trained martial artist due to the Disc's law of narrative causality. He is a devout follower of The Way of Mrs Cosmopilite, a way of moving through and accepting life of his own devising which he created after lodging with Mrs Cosmopilite in Ankh-Morpork. Lu-Tze utilises such fundamental axioms as 'If I've told you once I've told you a million times', 'Do you think I'm made of money?' And of course, 'Because.'

Lu-Tze is an allusion to the Chinese legendary philosopher Laozi, the sage to whom the Tao Te Ching is attributed. Lu-Tze is generally referred to just as 'Sweeper', in part a reference to Martin, the pessimist philosopher and sweeper in Voltaire's Candide.

== Mort ==
Mortimer — shortened to Mort ('death' in French), similar to his once master Death — is the title character in the fourth Discworld novel, Mort.

== Nijel the Destroyer ==
Nijel the Destroyer, son of Harebut the Provision Merchant, is a would-be barbarian hero, appearing in the fifth Discworld novel Sourcery. At six feet and 7 stone he is a clerk who desperately wants to be a barbarian hero and is currently half-way through a guide (Inne Juste 7 Dayes I wille make you a Barbearian Hero by Cohen the barbarian) on the subject, which includes a table of wandering monsters. Nijel wears the traditional hero loincloth supplemented with woollen long johns — his mother insisted. Nijel meets Rincewind in a snake pit and they escape together. Nijel meets and falls in love at first sight with Conina, which is reciprocated. Nijel triggers Conina's protective instinct which saves Nijel from his own lack of ability in his chosen career path.

== Mightily Oats ==
Mightily-Praiseworthy-Are-Ye-Who-Exalteth-Om 'Mightily' Oats is an Omnian priest, appearing in the twenty-third Discworld novel Carpe Jugulum. A recent graduate from theological college, he is summoned by Verence II and Queen Magrat of Lancre to officiate at the naming ceremony of their new-born daughter, a move which many Lancrastrians are sceptical of as they still view Omnians as torturous zealots. His most noticeable feature is a boil on the side of his nose. He is always in two minds about everything due to his consideration of the conflicting viewpoints of the schismatic sects of Omnianism, a trait which insulates him from the hypnotic powers of the vampiric Magpyr family during their invasion of Lancre. He has a philosophical dialogue with Granny Weatherwax during this time to determine the nature of evil.

== Om ==
The Great God Om — holy horns — is the monotheistic God of the country of Omnia on the Circle Sea. Om manifests from the realm of the gods to Omnia to appear as a tortoise, where he spends some years forgetting he is a deity. In the novel Small Gods, he manifests as an impotent (not omnipotent) tortoise because he has only one actual believer left.

== Rosemary Palm ==
Rosie Palm is the head of the Guild of 'Seamstresses' — actually prostitutes — first appearing in the eighth Discworld novel, Guards! Guards!, though first mentioned of in the third Discworld novel, Equal Rites.

Her establishment is used as a place to stay by Granny Weatherwax and Nanny Ogg in Maskerade — on the recommendation of 'Nev' Ogg, though Granny Weatherwax had stayed at Mrs Palm's establishment previously with Esk in Equal Rites — as well as by Lance-Constable Carrot on first settling in Ankh-Morpork (in Guards! Guards!).

Mrs Palm was considered almost a witch by Granny.

Her name is a play on the saying "a date with Rosie Palm and her five daughters," a slang term for masturbation.

Rosemary Palm is similar to real-life brothel owner, Lou Graham, whose employees were officially accredited as 'seamstresses'.

== Polly Perks ==
Polly Perks is the protagonist in the 31st Discworld novel, Monstrous Regiment. A Borogravian girl of 16 who joined the army under the name Oliver Perks in order to rescue her brother Paul and save her family's inn. She chose her false name, Oliver, because it corresponded with the folksong "Sweet Polly Oliver", which is about a girl running off to join the army. As a member of the 'Cheesemongers', Private 'Ozzer' Perks serves with the colourful Sergeant-Major Jack Jackrum, who teaches Polly how to be a man in the army.

== Walter Plinge ==
Walter Plinge, an odd-job man at the Ankh-Morpork Opera House, an awkward nervy figure in a beret who has an Opera Ghost alter-ego. Agnes Nitt helps him combine the aspects of his personality and become the director of music. Walter writes popular operas "with tunes you can hum" and might resemble Frank Spencer of the BBC television comedy Some Mothers Do 'Ave 'Em. Michael Crawford, the original performer of the eponymous character in Phantom of the Opera, plays Spencer.

== Mr Pin ==
Mr Pin is the brains of the New Firm, with Mr Tulip's brawn, a duo of interloping criminals in The Truth freshly arrived in Ankh-Morpork. In general Mr Pin makes the plans and decides where they are going to go and what they are going to do, but he is open to suggestions from his partner. Both men can become violent, but Mr Pin's violence is more directed and instrumental.

Mr Pin is an operative without guilt and scruples, and ultimately even turns on his long time partner.

Mr Pin and Mr Tulip are very similar in many respects to Messrs Croup and Vandemar, a violent duo in Neverwhere, written by Neil Gaiman. The two authors have collaborated before in Good Omens, and sometimes make reference to each other's works. However, Pratchett has denied any conscious reference in this case. The two characters also parody Vincent Vega and Jules Winnfield, hitmen in the Quentin Tarantino film Pulp Fiction, with their conversation about sausages-in-buns mirroring Vincent and Jules' conversation about the Quarter Pounder.

== Pteppicymon XXVIII (Teppic) ==
His Greatness the King Teppicymon XXVIII, Lord of the Heavens, Charioteer of the Wagon of the Sun, Steersman of the Barque of the Sun, Guardian of the Secret Knowledge, Lord of the Horizon, Keeper of the Way, the Flail of Mercy, the High-Born One, the Never-Dying King of Djelibeybi — lit. 'Child of the Djel', the Disc's version of ancient Egypt — is the protagonist of the seventh Discworld novel, Pyramids.

Teppic, as a young prince, is the first royal to physically leave the kingdom, to be educated at the Ankh-Morpork Assassins' Guild. Upon his return his foreign cosmopolitan nature clashes with the set in stone traditions of the ancient kingdom, especially its immutable high priest, Dios. Failing to govern the country as a man of the people, he falls back into his training as an assassin to help the country.

== Ptraci I ==
Queen Ptraci I of Djelibeybi is Teppic's half-sister and successor. A former handmaiden and favourite of her father, she was originally condemned to death for not voluntarily dying in order to serve the previous king in the afterlife. The Djelibeybian priests thought she would be easy to control as the new queen. They turned out to be very wrong. Like her half-brother she is keen to get in some decent plumbing. She appears in Pyramids; by the end of the novel she is enthusiastically embracing many of the stranger regimens, such as bathing in ass's milk, favoured by Cleopatra.

== Ronald Rust ==
Lord Rust is an Ankh-Morpork nobleman from a distinguished line, he first appears in, Men At Arms, where he is one of the nobles who does not take seriously d'Eath's proposal of restoring the Ankh-Morpork monarchy, the Rusts have survived by not being romantic.

Lord Rust makes various appearances across the series where his arrogance and entitlement comes in opposition at various times with Sam Vimes. One of Rust's defining characteristics is his unsurpassed military incompetence. He believes a victory is obtained when enemy casualties outnumber friendly casualties, earning him the descriptor, "the god's gift to the enemy, any enemy, and a walking advertisement for desertion."

== Ronald Saveloy ==
Ronald Saveloy is a member of Cohen the Barbarian's Silver Horde. He appears in the seventeenth Discworld novel Interesting Times. Unlike the elderly warriors that comprise the Horde, Saveloy is a former teacher from Ankh-Morpork. After discovering the Horde at a hideout of theirs whilst on a fossil hunting holiday, Saveloy joins them partly due to the underwhelming prospects of his academic career. Maintaining his mild-mannered demeanour including a vegetarian diet, he endeavours to 'civilise' the barbarians. This extends to the Horde's plan to install Cohen as the Agatean Emperor, in effect "stealing the empire", by infiltrating the Forbidden City in Hunghung, engaging in subterfuge and distraction, and exiling the Emperor. Frustrated that most of the barbarians would rather ransack and pillage the Palace and that the Five Noble Families are willing to engage the Horde in open warfare for the throne, Saveloy reveals his ulterior motive: he wanted to give the Horde a tangible legacy since most of their past exploits of slaying mythical creatures, robbing temples and saving maidens had led to the common belief that they were not real. During the war between the Horde and the armies of the Five Families, Saveloy embraces barbarism, adopting berserker-style fighting techniques where he enjoys a warrior's demise. His soul is ferried by a Valkyrie to the warrior's afterlife, where he considers the prospect of teaching evening classes and enquires about vegetarian options at the feasts.

== Mr Slant ==
Mr Slant is the president of the Guild of Lawyers, a position that he has held for a long time owing to his being a zombie. He is also one of the three founding and senior partners of Morecombe, Slant, & Honeyplace, Ankh Morpork's leading legal practice. Considering that Mr Slant is a zombie and that Mr Morecombe and Honeyplace are both vampires, they are old enough to have been around when many laws were first written up. Promotion is also an unlikely prospect in the firm. He is the undisputed head of any legal action in the city and is one of the major members of the civil council. But Mr Slant has also been involved in more sinister affairs. He has attempted to aid in deposing Lord Vetinari from power several times, but only through serving other clients and not from an actual desire of his own to depose of Vetinari.

He became a zombie after having been convicted of a crime and decapitated but, since he defended himself, refuses to pass on until his descendants pay the legal fees.

== Lord Snapcase ==
The Patrician who came to power after Lord Winder following the Glorious Revolution of the Twenty-Fifth of May. Also known as Mad or Psychoneurotic Lord Snapcase. During his reign, he was considered "eccentric" rather than mad by the upper classes, but he is now known by most Morporkians, including the nobles, as the Mad Lord. He was sadistic, and extremely fond of torture, much like his predecessor.

In Men at Arms, he was mentioned as having a cruet set designed by Bloody Stupid Johnson (where, due to Johnson's ineptitude with geometry meant that they are used as storage silos), and in Feet of Clay, he was mentioned to have made his horse a city councillor. Lord Snapcase was succeeded by Lord Havelock Vetinari.

== Juliet Stollop ==
In the 37th Discworld novel, Unseen Academicals, Juliet Stollop is stunningly beautiful and utterly empty-headed. She becomes a society sensation overnight as a supermodel.

A scion of a family of football hooligans, she falls in love with Trevor Likely — a likely lad — who supports an opposing team. Eventually, Trev joins a newly formed footballing league, and Juliet embarks on a new life as a wag and fashion model.

== Susan Sto Helit ==
Susan is the Duchess of Sto Helit and the granddaughter of Death.

== Glenda Sugarbean ==
Glenda is a somewhat plump, over-breasted girl who runs the Night Kitchen in the Unseen University until the events of the 37th Discworld novel, Unseen Academicals. She is the granddaughter of the chief cook at the Assassin's Guild, from whom she has inherited a large number of secret recipes.

Having spent most of her life forced to do other people's thinking for them, she is overwhelmed with uncertainty when her dim-witted best friend, Juliet, suddenly has the opportunity to be a supermodel. Initially cautious, she eventually relents and allows Juliet to follow her dream. In a similar vein, against her own better judgement, she allows herself to be swept off her feet by an unlikely romance with a goblin, Mr Nutt, and eventually goes off on an adventure with him to Überwald.

== Captain Findthee Swing ==
Captain Swing is the head of the secret police force, the Unmentionables in the Ankh-Morpork of the past in Night Watch. Swing attempted to control crime by ordering all weapons confiscated, reasoning a decline in crime figures would follow, but failed to acknowledge that criminals do not obey the law and greatly enjoy a lack of weapons in a society.

He is described as a thin, balding man in a long, old-fashioned black coat with large pockets who supports himself on an opera cane, in reality a poorly concealed swordstick. Swing moves and speaks in an erratic, jumpy fashion, in bursts and sputters rather than a continuous flow of movement or sound. He is, however, a skilled swordsman, who does not resort to flashy swashbuckling, but actually attacks his opponent.

Swing carries with him a large set of calipers and a steel ruler, to measure the facial characteristics of those he meets, to determine their personal traits (phrenology). He determines that Sam Vimes has the eye of a mass murderer. When Swing meets Death, he attempts to use phrenology to determine Death's character, but finds that Death has no characteristics he can measure.

The name Captain Swing has long been associated with civil unrest, being the pseudonym of the (possibly mythical) leader of the Swing Riots.

== Tacticus ==
General Callus Tacticus was a soldier of the Ankh-Morpork Empire, and is widely proclaimed to be the greatest general of all time. In fact, on the Discworld the word 'tactics' was derived from his name. He has been dead for nearly 2000 years by the start of the Discworld series. In Jingo his name is given as General A Tacticus. In Wintersmith, his first name is given as Callus.

Tacticus conquered a large area of the Discworld, both around the city of Ankh-Morpork and well into the rimward continent of Klatch. The ruined fortress city of Tacticum, located in the Klatchian desert, is encountered in Jingo. Tacticus' campaigns were as expensive as they were effective, encouraging the rulers of Ankh-Morpork to get rid of him. The city-state of Genua asked Ankh-Morpork for a Duke, Tacticus was promoted and sent there. Upon becoming a Genuan citizen, he evaluated the question of the greatest military threat posed by any other nation and then declared war upon Ankh-Morpork, thus ending its empire.

Sam Vimes opinion of why Tacticus was respected and not much liked by history is that Tacticus did not get a huge number of his men killed by his own arrogance and incompetence, usually a peccadillo of Ankh-Morpork leaders. The military advice of Tacticus sometimes turns up in various Discworld chronicles. One example being the chapter of his autobiography entitled "What to Do When One Army Occupies a Well-Fortified Fortress on Superior Ground and the Other Does Not" which begins with the sentence "Endeavour to be the one inside." Another good example of Tacticus' sense of pragmatism would be his maxim "It is always useful to face an enemy who is prepared to die for his country. This means that both he and you have exactly the same aim in mind."

Tacticus' military ability and writings may have some semblance to Sun Tzu.

== Tawneee ==
Tawneee (real name Betty) is an exotic dancer, introduced in Thud!. She is Nobby Nobbs's girlfriend for most of the book; they meet after Nobby slips an IOU into her garter belt instead of a dollar. The juxtaposition of the Helenic Tawnee being the girlfriend of Nobby, a man who carries a certificate to prove his species is a puzzle for those around them. Combing the humility and intelligence of a caterpillar, Tawnee is a complete innocent in the world of Ankh-Morpork. She is taken under the wing of Captain Angua and Sally who guide her around The Facts of Life.

== Jonathan Teatime ==
Jonathan Teatime (tee-ah-tim-ee) is an assassin without equal. He gains a scholarship to the Assassins' Guild, where he is considered peculiar and induces discomfort among even his fellow students. He specialises in creative solutions for killing immortal beings. In the 20th Discworld novel, Hogfather, he is recruited by the Auditors of Reality to assassinate the Hogfather, a winter deity who embodies the spirit of Hogswatchnight.

== Eric Thursley ==
A thirteen-year-old demonologist and the title character in the ninth Discworld novel, ~~Faust~~ Eric, where he lives at 13 Midden Lane, Pseudopolis. Eric inherited most of his demonology books and paraphernalia (including a talking parrot) from his grandfather. His parents, convinced he was destined to become a gifted demonologist, allowed him free rein over his grandfather's workshop. Eric was relatively unsuccessful as a demonologist until he manages to summon Rincewind from the Dungeon Dimensions instead of the demon he was hoping would appear to grant him wishes: mastery of the kingdoms of the world, to meet the most beautiful woman who ever lived, to live forever, and a large chest of gold.

== Victor Tugelbend ==
Long-time student wizard turned actor, Victor appears in Moving Pictures. His uncle left a legacy to continually pay for Victor's tuition at Unseen University, provided that Victor never scored below an 80 on an exam. Passing would mean the end of the grant, therefore, Victor studied hard enough to each year score 84; four points above the minimum to continue receiving the legacy and four points below the passing grade of 88. Being a student wizard meant enjoying the lifestyle of a wizard without the risk of assassinations by students wishing to advance.

Enticed by Holy Wood dreams, Victor travels to Holy Wood (an unorganised community centred on the "click" industry) to become an actor in moving pictures under the stage name, Victor Maraschino.

His stage name of Victor Maraschino seems a reference to Rudolph Valentino, given Victor's sex symbol roles as well as his ‘smouldering’ gaze onscreen, said to cause women to faint.

== Mr Tulip ==
Mr Tulip is, along with Mr Pin, a member of the New Firm, a duo of interloping criminals operating outside of the purview of the Thieves Guild in The Truth. He is something of a contradiction: a remorseless killer with the refined soul of a true fine-art connoisseur. He is differentiated from a common criminal by his habit of removing works of art from houses before committing arson, the ability to distinguish between priceless works of art and common forgeries, an encyclopaedic knowledge of hundreds of years of great artists and artisans and their works, and a refusal to use any artworks as blunt weapons or to profit from their ultimate destruction. He would not, for example, use a candlestick to knock someone out cold or steal it for its silver content. He is the muscle of the New Firm and, though an instinctive killer, recognises Mr Pin's cognitive skills and leaves the thinking to him. He suffers a mild speech impediment, continually causing him to insert "—ing" mid-sentence, (the suffix of an action verb without the verb itself) and unsuccessfully attempts to buy drugs (usually purchasing white powder such as sugar and calcium carbonate, with the only illegal drugs he is able to obtain being those for trolls such as slab). His primary skill in the New Firm is the application of his apparently unlimited supply of unspecific anger; Tulip has turned mindless violence into an art form. Mr Tulip's religion is that, those who die while holding a potato will be reincarnated. This belief, which is quite firm, is based on hearing his grandmother saying, during a famine, "You will be alright if you have your potato."

== Twoflower ==
Twoflower is a native of the Agatean Empire, on the Counterweight Continent, living in the major sea port of Bes Pelargic where he works as an insurance clerk. The first tourist in history on the Discworld, he wrote What I Did On My Holidays after his return to the Empire, acting as a catalyst for a revolution.

Ankh-Morporkians describe him as having four-eyes when he first arrives, not having seen spectacles before. In the first Discworld novel, The Colour of Magic. Josh Kirby's cover illustrations for The Colour of Magic and The Light Fantastic depict him with four actual eyes. He also introduces dentures and insurance/insurance fraud to Ankh-Morpork and beyond.

Twoflower is introduced in The Colour of Magic, touring the city of Ankh-Morpork, where he meets Rincewind whom he hires as a guide. Throughout the first two novels, he is followed by the Luggage, a travel chest which moves on hundreds of little legs, carrying his belongings.

Twoflower is a naïve tourist, running into danger constantly but being certain that nothing bad will happen to him since he is 'not involved.' He also believes in the fundamental goodness of human nature and that all problems can be resolved, if all parties show good will and cooperate, this convinces Rincewind that Twoflower's IQ is comparable to that of a pigeon.

By the time of Interesting Times, What I Did On My Holidays is considered a revolutionary pamphlet in his native land, due to its revealing the world outside of the Empire is not a hellish wasteland populated by "bloodsucking vampire ghosts". Twoflower still holds to his essential view of the world as good. The Discworld Atlas mentions that the Agatean Empire has become the 'People's Beneficient Republic of Agatea', headed by a chairman.

Outside of the Discworld he also appears in the computer game NetHack as the quest leader for the tourist class.

== Verence II ==
King Verence II of Lancre first appears in the 6th Discworld novel, Wyrd Sisters, as the jester of the newly crowned king of Lancre, Duke Felmet. He was previously the fool to King Verence I, as his father and grandfather were before him, it being a hereditary position. Verence the jester is the sole witness to the murder of Verence I, a situation which leads to Shakespearean series of events ending in the crowning of Verence II.

Verence attempts to reign throughout the rest of the series, striving to be a well-meaning king, taking 'kinging' very seriously, having learnt as a fool that life was no laughing matter. He tries to introduce parliamentary democracy to Lancre, giving the vote to everyone (or at least everyone who wasn't poor or criminal or insane or female, because there’s no sense in being stupid about things, they'd only use it irresponsibly) but with no-one attending the new Parliament.

Verence is technically an absolute ruler and will continue to be so provided he doesn't repeatedly ask Lancrestrians to do anything they don’t want to do. Lancrestrians wouldn’t dream of living in anything other than a monarchy, having done so for thousands of years knowing that it works. But they know they ought not to pay too much attention to what a king wants as there'll be another king along in forty years or so and he’ll be certain to want something different. So the king's job is to mostly stay in the palace, practise waving, face the right way on coins and let them get on with the ploughing, sowing, growing and harvesting. It is, as they see it, a social contract. They do as they always have, and he lets them.

== Lord Vetinari ==
Havelock Vetinari is the Patrician of Ankh-Morpork, where the maxim of "One Man, One Vote" holds true, the Patrician is the man, he has the vote.

== Vorbis ==
Appearing in the 13th Discworld novel, Small Gods, deacon Vorbis is the Head of the Omnian Quisition, an exquisitor who believes he is destined to become the next Cenobiarch and Eighth Prophet of Omnianism, thanks to his deft political manoeuvrings within the church, or "as the Great God Om told him." As the real Om has been incapacitated, Vorbis plans a bloody holy war (for Om's greater glory) against the rest of Klatch, orchestrating first, the conquest and annexation of Ephebe by manufacturing a casus belli to invade them.

Vorbis believes the Discworld is a perfect sphere and that steam-powered machines cannot exist, as Om states. These are examples of a 'fundamental truth,' Vorbis draws a distinction between the "trivial truth" perceived by the senses — such as the Discworld being flat and carried on the back of a giant turtle — and the "fundamental truth" of the church's teaching. He teaches that the physical world is merely a shadow of a deeper, spiritual reality that only the church can interpret, as Vorbis states, “There are some things which appear to be the truth, which have all the hallmarks of truth, but which are not the real truth. The real truth must sometimes be protected by a labyrinth of lies.”

After a death similar to that of Aeschylus, Vorbis encounters Death, and realises what he thought was the voice of Om, was just his own voice echoing in his head. He spends a hundred years sat motionless, until Brutha meets him again after his own passing, and they walk off together to face judgement.

== Lord Winder ==
Patrician of Ankh-Morpork, and predecessor to Mad Lord Snapcase. Also known as Homicidal Lord Winder. During the last years of his reign, he was extremely paranoid, albeit with good reason. He took pride in being pathologically careful about everything, running Ankh-Morpork as a police state, with his dreaded Cable Street Particulars, under the command of Captain Swing, causing dissidents to disappear.

He was deposed as a result of the Glorious Revolution of the Twenty-Fifth of May, during which he was assassinated by the future Lord Vetinari.

== Witches of the Disc ==
- Granny Weatherwax
- Tiffany Aching
- Magrat Garlick
- Nanny Ogg
- Agnes Nitt

== Ginger Withel ==
Theda Withel is from a little town you "probably haven't heard of", she runs away to Hollywood to be "the most famous person in the whole world," where she takes the name Ginger. She stars in several movies using the name, Delores De Syn, making use of her onscreen chemistry with Victor Tugelbend, usually as the maiden to be rescued. She achieves her goals when she sits next to Lord Vetinari and people recognise her but not him.

Ginger has an uncle Oswald, or possibly Osric who may or may not have been once the High Priest of Holy Wood. She is reminiscent of early screen stars; Ginger Rogers and Theda Bara.

== Wizards of the Unseen University ==
- Archchancellor Mustrum Ridcully - Archchancellor and head of the faculty at the university.
- The Bursar - the occasionally sane financial administrator at the university.
- The Dean - the rather over-excitable heavyweight member of the faculty.
- Hex - the continually evolving computer of the university.
- The Librarian - The librarian of UU.
- Ponder Stibbons - Head of Inadvisably Applied Magic and the one wizard who actually knows what’s going on at the university.
- Rincewind - a wizzard and long distance runner, usually found running away from things.

== Ly Tin Wheedle ==
Ly Tin Wheedle is referred to as arguably the Disc's greatest philosopher, as he likes to argue it. Ly's famous axioms an sayings occur throughout the Discworld series. Being from the Counterweight Continent, he is revered as a great sage there because of his peculiar smell, and his many sayings advocating respect for the old and the virtues of poverty, which are frequently quoted by the rich and elderly.

In addition to social philosophy, Ly is also a proponent of natural philosophy. When the philosophical community came to the conclusion that distance was an illusion and all places were in fact the same place, Ly was the philosopher to make the famed conclusion that although all places were in fact the same place, that place was very big. He has also theorised on the physical underpinnings of monarchy, on the premise you can't have more than one king, and that there is no gap between kings, so when a king dies the succession must therefore pass to the heir instantaneously, explaining royal succession by use of a particle known as a Kingon (or possibly Queon), musing about the possibility of a communications system based upon the systematic torture of a monarch (although at this point, he had been "thrown out of the bar").

It is said that someone at a party once asked Ly Tin Weedle 'Why are you here?' and the reply took three years.

== Lupine Wonse ==
Wonse is a former childhood gang associate of Sam Vimes who rises to the prominent role of being the secretary to Lord Vetinari. He always gives the impression of just being completed, with hair so oiled and slick that it looks painted.

Moonlighting in his secret identity as the Grand Master of the Elucidated Brethren of the Ebon Night, he summons a noble dragon (Draco Nobilis) to Ankh-Morpork intending it to be casus belli to dispose of the Patrician and reintroduce monarchy back into the city, a monarch which Lupine would control. The events of Guards! Guards! changes this plan after the dragon decides it ought to reign.

== William de Worde ==
William de Worde is a professional scribe in The Truth writing down interesting news of Ankh-Morpork for various monarchs and nobles abroad. When the printing press is invented in Ankh-Morpork he becomes the editor of the Disc's first newspaper, The Ankh-Morpork Times. Although he has an obsessive dislike of lying, working in journalism he has found pathways to circumnavigate around this. Being born to the purple William has moved into self-imposed exile from his background of wealthy nobility, earning his way in life to cast off the influence and control of his father, Lord de Worde.

Wynkyn de Worde and William Caxton sort of did something similar in medieval London.

== See also ==
- Great A'Tuin - The Great World Turtle, A'Tuin
- The Luggage - The Luggage (made of Sapient Pearwood)
- Nac Mac Feegle
- Sapient Species of Discworld
