= Going Postal =

2004 Discworld novel by Terry Pratchett

- First edition
- Author: Terry Pratchett
- Cover artist: Paul Kidby
- Language: English
- Series: Discworld; 33rd novel – 1st Moist von Lipwig story
- Subject: Fantasy, redemption, post office, John Stonehouse, finance/speculation; Characters: Moist von Lipwig; Locations: Ankh-Morpork
- Genre: Fantasy
- Publisher: Doubleday
- Publication date: 25 September 2004
- Awards: 2005 Finalist nominee for Nebula Award for Best Novel
- ISBN: 0-385-60342-8
- Preceded by: A Hat Full of Sky
- Followed by: Thud!

Going Postal is a fantasy novel by British writer Terry Pratchett, the 33rd book in his Discworld series, released in the United Kingdom on 25 September 2004. Unlike most of Pratchett's Discworld novels, Going Postal is divided into chapters, a feature previously seen only in Pratchett's children's books and the Science of Discworld series. These chapters begin with a synopsis of philosophical themes, in a similar manner to some Victorian novels and, notably, to Jules Verne stories. The title refers to both the contents of the novel and the idiom 'going postal'.

The book was on the shortlist for both the Nebula and Locus Awards for Best (Fantasy) Novel. It would also have been shortlisted for the Hugo Award for Best Novel, except that Pratchett withdrew it, as he felt stress over the award would mar his enjoyment of the Worldcon. This was the first time Pratchett had been shortlisted for either award.

== Plot ==
The protagonist of the story is Moist von Lipwig, a skilled con artist who was to be hanged for his crimes, but saved at the last moment by the cunning and manipulative Patrician of Ankh-Morpork Havelock Vetinari, who has Moist's death on the scaffold faked, being hanged "to within half an inch of [his] life".

In his office, Vetinari presents Moist with two options: he may accept a job offer to become Postmaster of the city's rundown Postal Service or he may choose to walk out of the door and never hear from Vetinari again. After determining that exiting through the door in question would lead to a fatal drop, Moist decides to accept the job.

After a thwarted attempt at escape, Moist is brought to the Post Office by his parole officer Mr. Pump, a golem. Moist learns that the Post Office has not functioned for decades, and the building is full of undelivered mail, concealed under a layer of pigeon dung. Only two employees remain: the aged Junior Postman Tolliver Groat and his assistant Stanley Howler.

Meanwhile, Vetinari is holding a meeting with the board executives of the Grand Trunk Company, a company that owns and operates a system of visual telegraph towers known as "clacks". He notes that since they have taken full control, the quality of service had gone down considerably. Despite unnerving most of the board, Vetinari fails to make headway, especially with its chairman, Reacher Gilt. It is rumoured that Reacher Gilt plans to usurp Vetinari as Patrician.

As Moist attempts to revitalise the postal service, he discovers that over the few months before taking the job, a number of his predecessors have predeceased in the building within weeks of each other in unusual circumstances. He also discovers that the mail inside the building has taken on a life of its own, and is nearly suffocated in a "letterslide".

Moist introduces postage stamps to Ankh-Morpork, employs retired postmen and golems to deliver the mail, and finds himself competing against the Grand Trunk Clacks line. He meets and falls in love with the chain-smoking golem-rights activist Adora Belle Dearheart, abd the two begin a relationship by the end of the book. Dearheart is the daughter of the Clacks founder Robert Dearheart, though the company was taken away from her father and the other founders by tricky financial manoeuvring. She still has useful contacts amongst the clacks operators.

Gilt sets banshee assassin Mr. Gryle on the Postmaster, but only manages to burn down much of the Post Office building. The banshee dies when Moist flips him onto the space-warping sorting machine. In order to rebuild the Post Office, Moist fakes divine intervention from several gods to retrieve the $150,000 he acquired from his past cons (a third of which goes in tithes to the gods who 'interceded').

Lipwig makes an outrageous wager with Gilt that he can deliver a message to Genua, 2000 miles from Ankh-Morpork, faster than the Grand Trunk can. "The Smoking Gnu", a group of clacks-crackers, sets up a plan to send '...the Woodpecker' (a Discworld equivalent to a killer poke) into the clacks system that will destroy the machinery, halting the message that Lipwig will race against. Lipwig talks the Gnu out of it, doubting its effectiveness in the face of professional clacks operators and wanting to leave the semaphore towers standing. Instead, Lipwig and the Gnu, using Trunk documents in Adora Belle's possession, intercept the message and replace it with a fake message from the dead which reveals the crimes of Gilt and the Grand Trunk board of directors. This plan succeeds, with Lord Vetinari launching an investigation into the allegations and ultimately (at Moist's insistence) returning the company to the Dearheart family.

Gilt is eventually arrested and finds himself in front of the Patrician, who offers a similar choice to the one Moist faced in the beginning of the book: run the mint or exit the room. Gilt, however, chooses to walk through the door, perhaps unknowingly, to his death.

== TV adaptation ==
Sky One produced a two-part television film, Terry Pratchett's Going Postal, which aired on 30–31 May 2010.

== Legacy ==
Based on a plot idea in this novel, after Terry Pratchett's death some websites honored him via a special HTTP header line.

Reading order guide
Preceded by A Hat Full of Sky	33rd Discworld Novel	Succeeded by Thud!
Preceded by None	1st Moist von Lipwig story Published in 2004	Succeeded by Making Money
