= Fiction featuring Merlin =

Stories involving the mythical figure Merlin

Works involving the mythical figure Merlin have been popular since the renewed interest in the legend of King Arthur in modern times. As noted by Arthurian scholar Alan Lupack, "numerous novels, poems and plays center around Merlin. In American literature and popular culture, Merlin is perhaps the most frequently portrayed Arthurian character."

== Film ==
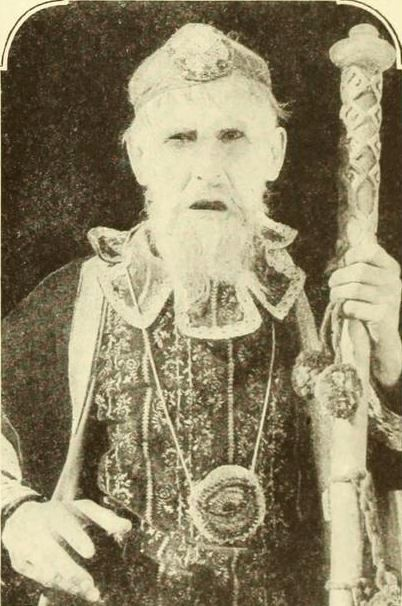
William V. Mong as Merlin in the American film A Connecticut Yankee in King Arthur's Court (1921).

- The Green Knight (2021), played by Emmet O'Brien.
- Hellboy (2019), played by Brian Gleeson.
- The Kid Who Would Be King (2019), played by Angus Imrie (young form) and Patrick Stewart (true form).
- Transformers: The Last Knight (2017), played by Stanley Tucci.
- King Arthur: Legend of the Sword (2017), played by Kamil Lemieszewski.
- Kingsman film franchise (2015–present), played by Mark Strong (Kingsman: The Secret Service and Kingsman: The Golden Circle) and Djimon Hounsou (The King's Man); here, Merlin is a title rather than a person.
- Avalon High (2010), the Disney Channel Original Movie based on Meg Cabot's 2005 novel of the same name, played by Joey Pollari; in this version, the character of Miles is the reincarnation of Merlin.
- The Sorcerer's Apprentice (2010), played by James A. Stephens.
- Merlin and the War of the Dragons (2008), played by Simon Lloyd Roberts.
- Shrek the Third (2007), voiced by Eric Idle.
- The Last Legion (2007), played by Ben Kingsley.
- Merlin's Apprentice (2006), played by Sam Neill.
- King Arthur (2004), played by Stephen Dillane; in this version, Merlin is presented as a Celtic Druid instead of a wizard.
- The Sorcerer's Apprentice (2001), played by Robert Davi.
- Merlin: The Return (1999), played by Rik Mayall.
- Quest for Camelot (1998), voiced by John Gielgud.
- Merlin (1998), played by Sam Neill. In the miniseries, Merlin fights the pagan goddess Queen Mab.
- Merlin: The Quest Begins (1998), played by Jason Connery.
- Stargate SG-1 (1997), played by Matthew Walker and by Michael Shanks when inhabiting the character Daniel's body.
- Merlin's Shop of Mystical Wonders (1996), played by George Milan.
- Kids of the Round Table (1995), played by Malcolm McDowell.
- A Kid in King Arthur's Court (1995), played again by Ron Moody.
- Merlin and the Dragons (1991), narrated film by Kevin Kline.
- Dragon and Slippers (1991), voiced by Tony Randall.
- Vasantha Sena (1985), played by Shobana.
- Arthur the King (1983), played by Edward Woodward.
- Knightriders (1981), played by Brother Blue.
- Excalibur (1981), played by Nicol Williamson.
- Le Dernier métro (1980), played by Marcel Berbert.
- The Spaceman and King Arthur (1979), played by Ron Moody; Merlin is, in a rather unusual fashion, portrayed as an evil character.
- Licensed to Love and Kill (1979), played by John Arnatt.
- Son of Dracula (1974), played by Ringo Starr.
- Camelot (1967), played by Laurence Naismith.
- 7 Faces of Dr Lao (1964), played by Tony Randall.
- The Sword in the Stone (1963), the Disney animated adaptation of T.H. White's book, voiced by Karl Swenson.
- Siege of the Saxons (1963), played by John Laurie.
- Lancelot and Guinevere (1963), played by Mark Dignam.
- The Wizard of Baghdad (1960); at the film's end, a genie played by Dick Shawn is told his next assignment will be as Merlin.
- Santa Claus (1959), played Armando Arriola.
- Faites-moi confiance (1954), played by Pierre Larquey.
- Knights of the Round Table (1953), played by Felix Aylmer.
- Adventures of Sir Galahad (1949), played by William Fawcett.
- A Connecticut Yankee in King Arthur's Court (1949), played by Murvyn Vye.
- A Connecticut Yankee (1931), played by Brandon Hurst.
- A Connecticut Yankee in King Arthur's Court (1921), played by William V. Mong.

== Games ==
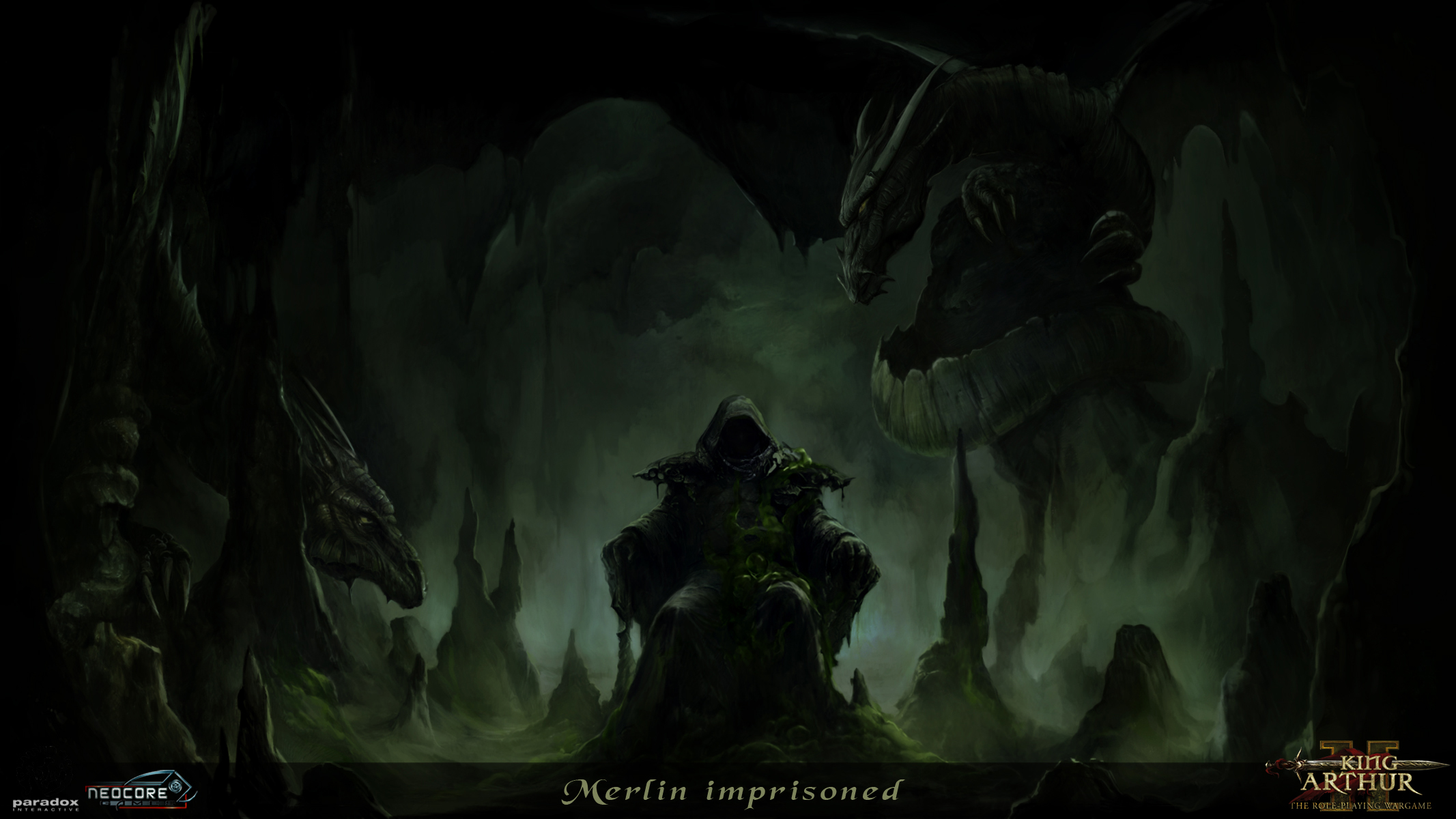
"Merlin imprisoned", a concept art for the video game King Arthur II (2012).

- In Age of Wonders II and Age of Wonders: Shadow Magic, Merlin is a playable character.
- In Curses, Merlin is an important figure in the story's history.
- In Fate/Grand Order, Merlin is playable as a Caster-class servant.
  - Merlin's female 'Prototype' is a playable Caster-class servant debuted in the Arcade version of the game, who later became playable in the original mobile version under the name Lady Avalon.
- In the arcade game Gauntlet, Merlin is one of the four playable heroes. His role in the game series continued until Gauntlet IV for the Sega Genesis.
- In Blazing Dragons, Merlin, renamed Mervin, is Sir George's wizard companion, advisor and sidekick of Castle Grim, and antagonist. He is voiced by Rob Paulsen.
- The Disney version of Merlin appears in Kingdom Hearts, Kingdom Hearts II, Kingdom Hearts Birth by Sleep, and Kingdom Hearts III. This Merlin is depicted in the same way as he appeared in Disney's film The Sword in the Stone. Though silent in the original game, he has audible dialogue provided by Jeff Bennett in the sequel.
- In Magic and Mayhem, Merlin is the game's final antagonist.
- In Master of Magic, Merlin is one of the predefined wizards.
- In RuneScape, Merlin is a part of three quests, including Merlin's Crystal (a quest to free Merlin and become one of the Knights of the Round Table), The Holy Grail, and King's Ransom.
- In Sonic and the Black Knight, the character Merlina is based on Merlin. Merlin is Merlina's grandfather.
- In the 2013 video game Soul Sacrifice, Merlin was the game's antagonist. In the English version of the game, he is known as the Magusar. Merlin reappeared in the game's sequel, Soul Sacrifice Delta, to conclude the Magusar's story.
- In Wizard101, the character Merlin (who presents himself as "Merle Ambrose") is the headmaster of Ravenwood School of Magical Arts and assigns players multiple quests.
- In Young Merlin, the player follows Merlin in his youth.
- In Zoda's Revenge: StarTropics II, Merlin gives the protagonist, Mike, psychic abilities to help him throughout the game.
- In the Avalon variant of The Resistance, Merlin is given knowledge at the start of every game who the evil players are, but must keep his identity secret or else the evil players can redeem a lost game by correctly guessing which player is Merlin.
- In SMITE: Battleground of the Gods, Merlin is a playable character.
- In Lego Marvel Super Heroes 2, Merlin is a side mission and a playable character.
- In Disney Dreamlight Valley, the Disney version of Merlin appears as a villager and guide for the player.
- In Hogwarts Legacy, players can find puzzles called Trials of Merlin, and solve them for extra inventory space.

== Literature ==
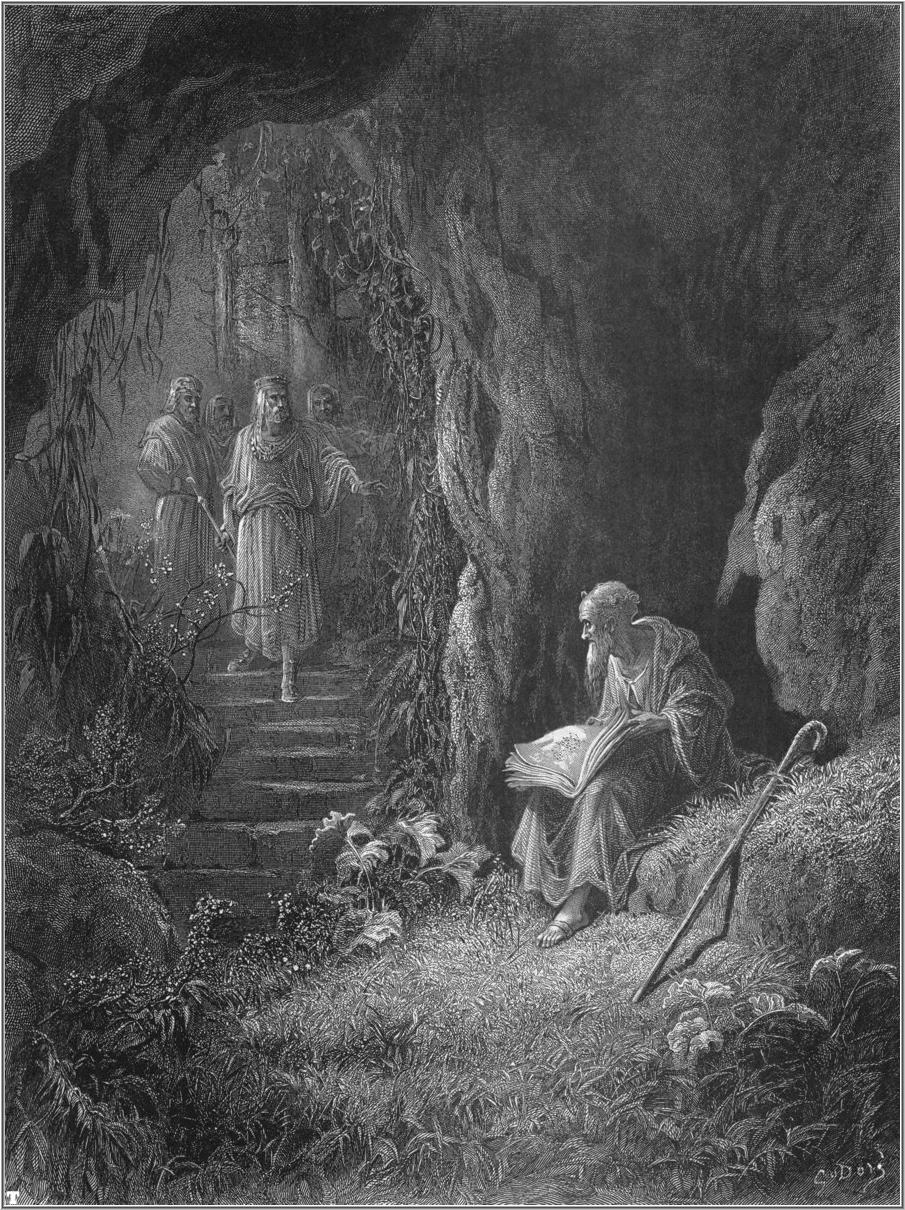
Merlin in Gustave Doré's illustration of Lord Alfred Tennyson's Idylls of the King, 1868.

- Mark Twain presents Merlin in his 1889 novel A Connecticut Yankee in King Arthur's Court as a complete charlatan with no real magical powers. The character seems to stand for (and to satirize) superstition. However, near the end of the book, Merlin seems to possess real magical powers.
- C.S. Lewis used the figure of Merlin Ambrosius in his 1946 novel That Hideous Strength, the third book in The Space Trilogy. In it, Merlin has supposedly lain asleep for centuries to be awakened for the battle against the materialistic agents of the devil, able to consort with the angelic powers because he came from a time when sorcery was not yet a corrupt art. Lewis' character of Ransom has apparently inherited the title of Pendragon from the Arthurian tradition. Merlin also mentions "Numinor", a nod to J.R.R. Tolkien's Númenor.
- In John Cowper Powys' novel Porius: A Romance of the Dark Ages (1951), Myrddin Wyllt, or Merlin the Wild, is the Emperor Arthur's counselor, a major character in the story. Powys identifies him with Cronos, or Saturn, the father of Zeus. Merlin also plays an important part in Powys's A Glastonbury Romance (1934) and Morwyn (1937).
- Merlin Ambrosius and other aspects of Arthurian mythology appear in a semi-science fiction context in Theodore Sturgeon's short story Excalibur and the Atom (1951).
- In the novel Merlín e Familia (1955) written by the Galician author Álvaro Cunqueiro, Merlin dwells in the Galician forest of Esmelle and is visited by mythical figures seeking magical advice. This story synthesizes Arthurian legend and Galician folktales.
- Susan Cooper's The Dark Is Rising series (first published between 1965 and 1977) has Merlin as the central character in an Arthurian fantasy series about the battle between "the Dark and the Light". Some of the child characters know him as "Gummerry" (a contraction of Great Uncle Merry). He is also variously known as Professor Merriman Lyon, Merry Lyon, Mer-lion, and Merlin.
- In T.H. White's 1958 Arthurian retelling, The Once and Future King, "Merlyn" has a curious affliction of living backward in time to everyone else. This affliction also appears in Dan Simmons' Hyperion (1989) as the "Merlin sickness". A related novel to The Once and Future King is The Book of Merlyn (1977).
- In Mary Stewart's Merlin Trilogy (first published between 1970 and 1979), Myrddin Emrys (Merlin Ambrosius) is the protagonist of the first two novels, The Crystal Cave (1970) and The Hollow Hills (1973), which are based on earlier traditions of the character. The last book of the trilogy, The Last Enchantment, and a related book, The Wicked Day, focus more on Arthur and Mordred, though the former is still told from Merlin's viewpoint. Stewart portrays Aurelius Ambrosius (brother to Uther Pendragon) as his father, and thus makes him Arthur's cousin. In the end, Merlin goes mad due to Morgause's poison.
- Merlin's Mirror (1975) by Andre Norton, tells the story of the half-human, half-alien Merlin.
- Merlin (1978) by Robert Nye is a bawdy, anti-Christian version of the Arthurian story, as relived by Merlin after Nimue had trapped him. Though dedicated to Malory, it draws rather from the earlier texts, curiously intertwining references to Kaballah and explicit erotic passages.
- Merlin plays a modern-day villain in Roger Zelazny's short story The Last Defender of Camelot (1979), which won the 1980 Balrog Award for short fiction and was adapted into an episode of the television series The Twilight Zone in 1986.
- Cyr Myrddin, the Coming of Age of Merlin (1979) by Michael de Angelo is the story of the early life of Merlin as he searches for his destiny.
- Merlin, called Aurelianus, is a character in Tim Powers' novel The Drawing of the Dark (1979), which describes the reincarnation of King Arthur as an Irishman named Brian Duffy leading the forces of the West into battle against the forces of the East in 16th century Vienna.
- Stephen King mentions a character called Maerlyn in The Dark Tower series of novels (the first novel published in 1982), as well as the prequel comic The Gunslinger Born (2007). Although this Maerlyn is an adviser to an alternative Earth's version of King Arthur, he appears to be evil, as he sires the evil sorcerer Marten Broadcloak and creates the soul-corrupting Wizard's Rainbow.
- Marion Zimmer Bradley's 1983 The Mists of Avalon retells the Arthurian legend with Morgan Le Fay as the protagonist, in the tradition of John Gardner's Grendel. It includes two distinct characters who, in succession, hold the title of "The Merlin of Britain", an office which grants leadership of the Druids in the same way that "The Lady of the Lake" is the title of the high priestess of Avalon.
- René Barjavel's novel L'Enchanteur (1984) tells the story of the Knights of the Round Table and the quest for the Holy Grail from the perspective of Merlin and his relationship with the Lady of the Lake.
- Arthurian scholar Nikolai Tolstoy (a distant relative of Leo Tolstoy) wrote two books about Merlin, a non-fiction The Quest For Merlin (1985) and a historical fantasy The Coming of the King (1988), the first of an unfinished trilogy. The latter book's depiction of Merlin may be the most historically accurate of all since he lives after Arthur's death. The hero Beowulf even appears as an invader.
- In Merlin (1989), a novel by Michel Rio, Merlin is presented as a strategist and a wise man rather than a wizard, an advisor to the king and, later, Morgana's teacher. A hundred-year-old Merlin reflects upon the fate of Avalon and remembers people who surrounded him throughout his long life. There are also two connected novels, Morgane (1999) and Arthur (2002) told from the respective perspectives.
- Merlin is one of the main characters in the Magic Tree House series of children's books by Mary Pope Osborne (the first novel published in 1992). He appears in the later volumes of the series, known as The Merlin Missions.
- Merlin (1988) and Pendragon (1994), the second and fourth books of Stephen Lawhead's fantasy Pendragon Cycle series respectively, are narrated by Merlin (Myrddin) and seen through his viewpoint. Lawhead makes him a half-Atlantean king of Dyfed, who goes insane but recovers after years of living in the forest; he then assumes the roles of prophet, adviser, and bard.
- Merlin is a central figure in Jack Whyte's nine-volume series The Camulod Chronicles (first published between 1992 and 2005). The series presents a full retelling of the Arthurian legend with entirely natural explanations of the magical abilities attributed to Merlin.
- In A Logical Magician (1994), also published as A Modern Magician, and its sequel A Calculated Magic (1996) by Robert Weinberg, Merlin is portrayed as a being brought into existence through belief. Thus, here Merlin possesses all the powers general belief grants him.
- Fred Saberhagen's novel Merlin's Bones (1995) is told partly from the perspective of a young Merlin.
- In Bernard Cornwell's The Warlord Chronicles (first published between 1995 and 1997), Merlin is a druid who rules over Avalon: all the land seen from the top of his hall in Ynys Wydryn.
- T.A. Barron portrays Merlin as a young man in his The Lost Years of Merlin series (the first novel published in 1996), and as an adult in its sequel series, The Great Tree of Avalon. Merlin also figures prominently in Barron's Merlin Effect, which may be in the same fictional continuity.
- The Young Merlin Trilogy by Jane Yolen (first published between 1996 and 1997), featuring the novels Passager, Hobby, and Merlin, re-imagines the story of Merlin in his boyhood. Abandoned by his parents and left to live in the woods at the age of eight, he discovers his powers at twelve.
- J.K. Rowling portrays Merlin as a famous or almost God-like wizard in her Harry Potter series (first published between 1997 and 2007) and refers to him as "The Prince of Enchanters."
  - The magical population uses the expression "Merlin's Beard" as a substitute for "My God."
  - "The Order of Merlin," mentioned throughout the books, is given to witches and wizards for great accomplishments and is given in three classes: First, Second, and Third; it is similar to an OBE. According to the Harry Potter website Pottermore, the Order of Merlin began as an organization formed by Merlin to protect Muggles (non-magical beings).
  - Merlin is featured on a Famous Witches and Wizards Collectors card; such cards are included with chocolate frogs.
  - Albus Dumbledore much resembles Merlin.
  - As in many other stories, Merlin is the enemy of Morgan le Fay.
  - The Harry Potter website Pottermore states that Merlin was a Slytherin, despite the fact that real-world mythology places Merlin's existence several centuries before the founding of Hogwarts.
- Jim Butcher's The Dresden Files series (the first novel published in 2000) includes Merlin as both a title (leader of the White Council) as well as a man responsible for the creation of the supernatural prison Demonreach.
- Merlin is the main character in Robert Holdstock's The Merlin Codex trilogy of mythic fiction novels (first published between 2001 and 2006), which traces Merlin's adventures in Europe over a span of two millennia; this trilogy places him alongside Jason and the Argonauts and Urtha Pendragon. Merlin is also a major character in Holdstock's short novel Merlin's Wood (1994).
- In Diana Wynne Jones' book The Merlin Conspiracy (2003), Merlin is not a person, but rather a title. The Merlin of the kingdom is entrusted with the kingdom's magical health.
- Simon Green's Nightside series (first published between 2003 and 2012) contains a character named Merlin Satanspawn, who is the son of the Devil and King Arthur's mentor and friend.
- In the romantic urban fantasy Enchanted, Inc. (2005) and its sequels by Shanna Swendson, Merlin is the CEO of Magic, Spells, and Illusions, Inc.
- Sherrilyn Kenyon (writing under the name of Kinley MacGregor) includes a "Penmerlin Emrys" of Arthurian legend in her Lords of Avalon series (first published between 2006 and 2018).
- Books based on the British TV show Merlin (2008) feature an adolescent Merlin in King Uther's Camelot.
- Merlin appears as the antagonist in James A. Owen's The Indigo King (2008) in the Chronicles of the Imaginarium Geographica series. In the book, Owen discusses the development of Merlin into the Cartographer of the Imaginarium Geographica. Merlin comes from a place known as the Archipelago of Dreams, where he was born as Myrdyyn along with his twin brother, Madoc (who would become Mordred). He is portrayed as an ambitious and treacherous man who was banished from the Archipelago for trying to use knowledge of the future to shape it. He then travels to Britain (then called Albion) and changes his name to Merlin. Sometime after this, he becomes the apparent father of Arthur through the Lady of the Lake.
- In Chapter 19 of James Rollins' sixth Sigma Force novel, The Doomsday Key (2009), Father Rye and historian Wallace Boyd tell the group seeking the Doomsday Key that Bardsey Island was home to Fomorian royalty and that Merlin was a famous Druid priest, buried on sacred Bardsey Island with other prominent Druids.
- Kristine Papin Morris explores Merlin's emotional childhood in the Merlin of Carmarthen series, which features Merlin of Carmarthen (2010) and Merlin of Calidon (2013).
- In the urban fantasy series Arkwell Academy (first novel published in 2013) written by Mindee Arnett, Merlin is the main antagonist who sets out to claim a legendary sword of great power, only to be thwarted by protagonist Dusty Everhart.
- In the High School DxD (2014-) light novel series written by Ichiei Ishibumi, the mythological Merlin of Arthurian legend (under the name Merlin Ambrosius) was stated to have founded the system of magic and sorcery used by human beings by studying demon magic, and was considered the first human magician.
- In The Seven Deadly Sins, Book 1, the First Hunt 2021 written by Gabriel Estes, Merlin is a sorcerer in Caerleon who gives Exevalathor a grimoire in the form of a pair of gauntlets called the Gauntlets of Ira. He is later revealed to be Satan, the Sin of Wrath, aged and weakened from the side effects of having the Sin of Wrath sealed within him.

== Music, musicals, and operas ==
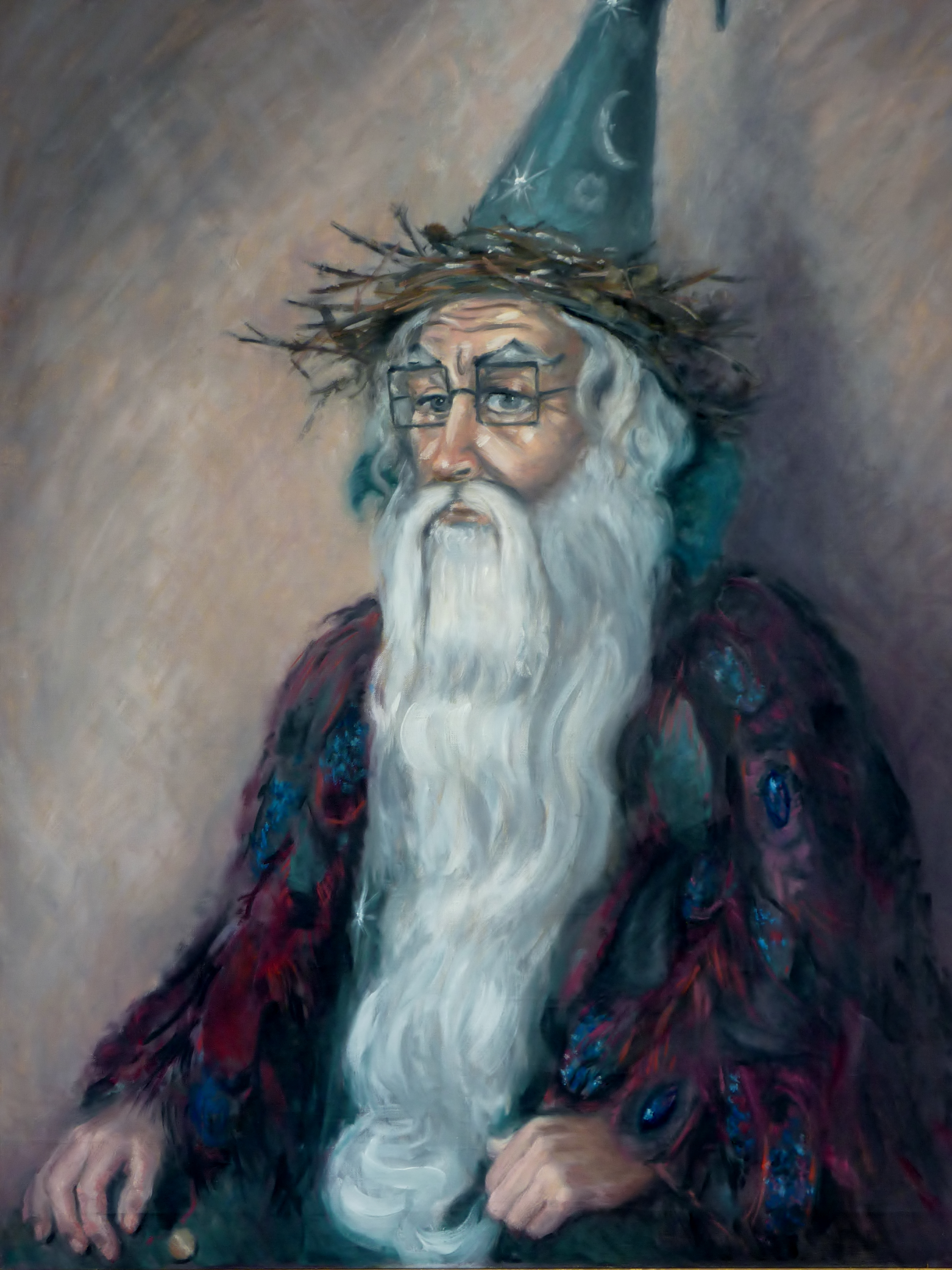
Portrait of Don Crosby as Merlin from Camelot by Douglas Baulch, 1963.

- Merlin is an opera composed by Karl Goldmark that premiered in 1886.
- Merlin is an opera by Spanish composer Isaac Albéniz that was completed in 1902 but not premiered until 2004. The opera retells Arthurian legend with some dramatic changes for the stage.
- Merlyn has been played by various actors in various productions of the Camelot musical and its spinoffs:
  - David Hurst and later Louis Turenne in the original 1960–63 Broadway production of Camelot
  - Laurence Naismith in the 1967 film version
  - James Valentine in the 1980 New York revival, 1981–82 Broadway revival, and 1993 Broadway revival
  - James A. Stephens in the one-night 2011 Annual Benefit Gala for the Irish Repertory Theatre on Broadway
- "Merlin, the Magician" is the fourth track on Rick Wakeman's album The Myths and Legends of King Arthur and the Knights of the Round Table (1975).
- Merlin (1983) is a Broadway musical featuring illusionist Doug Henning and music by Elmer Bernstein.
- A fictionalized version of Merlin appears in Ayreon's first album The Final Experiment (1995).
- Merlin is played by Bob Catley of Magnum in the rock operas Once and Future King Part I and Once and Future King Part II (2003), composed by Gary Hughes of Ten.
- Merlin – Bard of the Unseen (2003) is a concept album by progressive rock band Kayak about Merlin's life. It is a new version of side 1 of their 1981 album Merlin with nine new songs added.
- Merlin, played by David Alexis, is one of the major characters in the French comedy musical La Légende du Roi Arthur (2015).

== Television ==
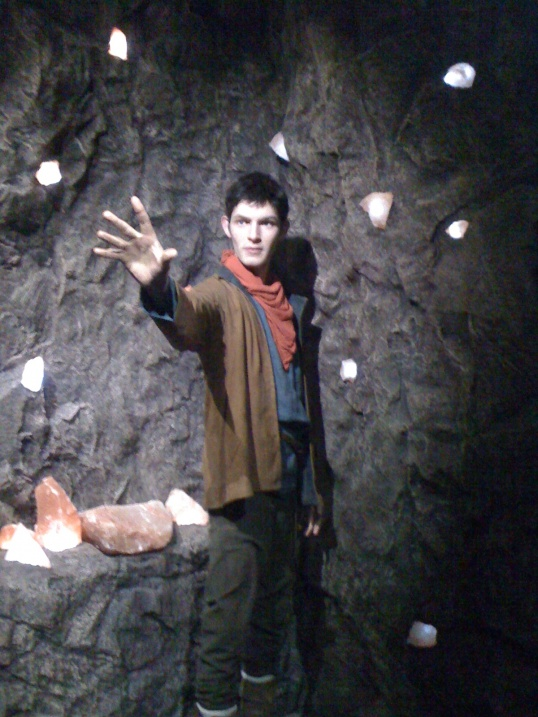
Wax figure of Merlin (Colin Morgan) from the homonymous 2008-2012 TV series, displayed at the exhibition Merlin: The Dragon Tower at Warwick Castle.

- The Pendragon Cycle: Rise of the Merlin (2026), an adaptation of the book series. He is played by Tom Sharp.
- Cursed, a Netflix adaptation of a book of the same name by Frank Miller and Tom Wheeler; he is played by Gustaf Skarsgård.
- Fate/Grand Order - Absolute Demonic Front: Babylonia (2019-2020), a Japanese fantasy anime series; Merlin, voiced by Takahiro Sakurai, is part of the main cast. Previously, the same Merlin made a small cameo in episode 23 of Fate/Apocrypha (2017).
- Trollhunters: Tales of Arcadia (2016–18), an American animated fantasy web television. Voiced by David Bradley, Merlin first appears in the episode "Unbecoming" (2017) as the wizard who created the Trollhunter's amulet. He also makes cameos in the follow-up series 3Below: Tales of Arcadia (2018–19), and was one of the major characters in the final installment of the Tales of Arcadia trilogy, Wizards: Tales of Arcadia (2020).
- Legends of Tomorrow (2016–22), an American superhero television series, based on the characters of DC Comics and set in the Arrowverse. In the episode "Camelot/3000" (2017), Merlin is revealed to be a superheroine, Stargirl. Portrayed by Sarah Grey, Stargirl escaped from 1956 to the sixth century to guard a fragment of the Spear of Destiny, which she then used to create the court of Camelot.
- Sofia the First (2012–18), an American animated television series; features numerous references to Merlin who is idolized by the character of Cedric the Sorcerer. The former later appears in the episode "Gone With the Wand" (2016), where he is depicted in his traditional Disney design and voiced by Jeff Bennett.
- Nanatsu no Taizai (2016), also known as The Seven Deadly Sins, a Japanese anime series based on the manga by the same name; features a female Merlin, voiced by Maaya Sakamoto, as The Boar's Sin of Gluttony and tutor of a younger Prince Arthur.
- Once Upon a Time (2011–18), an American fairy tale drama television series. Merlin, known as the Sorcerer, first appears in the fourth season in the episode "Lily" (2015). Elliot Knight is the first black actor to play Merlin in a prominent production.
- Camelot (2011), a historical-fantasy-drama television series of conjoined Irish, British, American, and Canadian production; Merlin is played by Joseph Fiennes.
- Batman: The Brave and the Bold (2008–11), an American animated television series based in part on the DC Comics series The Brave and the Bold; in the episode "Day of the Dark Knight!" (2009), Merlin was voiced by David McCallum.
- Merlin (2008–12), a British fantasy-adventure drama television programme by BBC filmed in Wales and France, in which young Merlin, played by Colin Morgan, has to hide his magic while protecting Prince Arthur.
- Pé na Jaca (2006), a Brazilian telenovela; Merlin is played by Humberto Martins.
- Merlin's Apprentice (2006), an American-Canadian miniseries. It is a sequel to the 1998 television miniseries Merlin with Sam Neill reprising his role as Merlin, albeit as a slightly different version of the character.
- King Arthur's Disasters (2005–06), a British animated series; Merlin is played by Matt Lucas.
- Kaamelott (2005–09), a French comedy medieval fantasy television series; Merlin is played by Jacques Chambon.
- Potatoes and Dragons (2004), an animated series of conjoined Canadian and French production; Merlin is voiced by John Vamvas.
- Stargate SG-1 (1997–2007), Stargate Atlantis (2004–09), and Stargate: The Ark of Truth (2008), part of the Stargate franchise; Merlin is represented here as an Ancient named Myrddin (originally Moros) from the Pegasus galaxy, who ascended to a higher plane of existence, descended to a lower plane of existence on Earth, and proceeded to 'create' King Arthur and his Knights of the Round Table. Played by Matthew Walker, he first appears in an episode of Stargate Atlantis, "Before I Sleep" (2004).
- Sítio do Pica-Pau Amarelo (2001–07), a Brazilian television series based on the eponymous book series written by Monteiro Lobato; Merlin, played by Emiliano Queiroz, featured in a number of episodes in 2003.
- ChuckleVision (1987–2009), a British television series; in the episode Bookshop Chuckles (2003), Merlin is played by Leslie Schofield.
- The Jersey (1999–2004), an American comedy television series based on the Monday Night Football Club books by Gordon Korman; in the episode "Origins: Part 1" (2003), Merlin is played by Angus Scrimm.
- Justice League (2001–04), an American animated television series, part of the DC Animated Universe; in the episode "A Knight of Shadows: Part 1" (2002), Merlin is voiced by W. Morgan Sheppard.
- Guinevere Jones (2002), a Canadian/Australian fantasy television series about a modern teenage girl who is the reincarnation of Guinevere; Merlin is played by Ted Hamilton.
- The Fairly OddParents (2001–17), an American animated television series; in the episode "Knighty Knight" (2002), Merlin, voiced by Jim Ward, is a fraudulent magician who uses his nephew, Arthur, to run away from the kingdom they live in.
- The Outer Limits (1995–2002), a Canadian-American television series; in the episode "The Tipping Point" (2002), Merlin is played by Jim Byrnes.
- The Zack Files (2000–02), a Canadian science fiction television program; in the episode Once and Future Zack (2002), Merlin is played by J. Adam Brown.
- Sir Gadabout: The Worst Knight in the Land (2002–03), a British children's comedy television programme; Merlin is played by Ian Lindsay.
- House of Mouse (2001–03), an American animated television series; Merlin is played by Hamilton Camp.
- MythQuest (2001) a Canadian television series; in the episode Sir Caradoc at the Round Table, Merlin is played by David Gant.
- The Brak Show (2000–03, 2007), an American animated sitcom; in the episode Time Machine (2001), Merlin is voiced by Marc Cram.
- The Mists of Avalon (2001), a TV mini-series of conjoined Czech, German, and American production; Merlin is played by Michael Byrne.
- Arthur's Quest (1999), an American television film. In an attempt to save young King Arthur from the evil sorceress Morgana, Merlin, played by Arye Gross, transports him into 20th-century America.
- A Knight in Camelot (1998), an American television film about a modern scientist who gets sent to King Arthur's times when the machine shes invented malfunctions; Merlin played by Ian Richardson.
- Merlin (1998), an American television miniseries starring Sam Neill as Merlin. The film depicts his life, from his magical birth through the reigns of Vortigern, Uther, and Arthur, and ends with him as an old man.
- Histeria! (1998–2000), an American animated series; in the episode "Histeria Satellite TV" (1998), Merlin was voiced by Paul Rugg.
- Sabrina, the Teenage Witch (1996–2003), in the episode Oh What a "Tangled Spell She Weaves" (1997), Merlin was played by Bob Goldthwait.
- The New Adventures of Robin Hood (1997–98), an American television series; Merlin was played by Geoffrey Bayldon in the episode The Legend of Olwyn and David Gant in Return to Camelot.
- Timmy Towers (1997–2002), a British children's television series; in the episode "No Time Like the Present", Merlin was played by Stephen Mulhern.
- The Real Adventures of Jonny Quest (1996–97), an American animated television series; in the episode "The Alchemist" (1996), Merlin was voiced by Michael Des Barres.
- The Crystal Cave (1996), an American TV movie on the art of spiritual transformation; Merlin is played by Robert Guillaume.
- Blazing Dragons (1996–1998); Merle the Wizard (played by Suzanne Coy), a wisecracking female magician who fits the stereotype of a witch much more than that of a wizard, is based on Merlin.
- Alchemy (1996), an American TV movie on the art of spiritual transformation; Merlin is played by Robert Guillaume.
- Princess Gwenevere and the Jewel Riders (1995–96), an American comic fantasy-themed animated children's television series; Merlin, voiced by Bob Kaliban, is an ancient wizard who had discovered Avalon and tamed its magic centuries ago.
- Darkstalkers (1995) is an American children's animated TV series loosely based on the Capcom fighting game Darkstalkers: The Night Warriors. Harry, the main character of the series, is a descendant of the great sorcerer Merlin. Merlin himself appears in the twelfth episode of the show as a silent character.
- King Arthur and the Knights of Justice (1992–93), an animated series of conjoined American, Canadian, and French production; Merlin is voiced by Jim Byrnes.
- MacGyver (1985–92), an American action-adventure television series; in the two-part episode "Good Knight MacGyver" (1991), Merlin, played by Time Winters, is shown to be a bumbling trickster who relies on the title character's wit and wisdom to save the day.
- The Legend of Prince Valiant (1991–93), an American animated television series based on the Prince Valiant comic strip created by Hal Foster; Merlin voiced by Alan Oppenheimer.
- Doctor Who (1963–89, 1996, 2005–present), a British science fiction television programme; the episode "Battlefield" (1989) suggests that Arthurian legend in our world is influenced by actual events in a parallel world, and when the Seventh Doctor played by Sylvester McCoy is recognized as Merlin by the knight Ancelyn, Mordred, and finally Morgaine, it is implied that Merlin is, or will be, a future (or alternate-dimension) incarnation of the Doctor. The 2010 episode "The Pandorica Opens" confirms this.
- Knightmare (1987–94), a British children's adventure game show; Merlin is played by John Woodnutt.
- The Comic Strip (1987), an American animated series; Merlin's son Melvin, voiced by Earl Hammond, appeared on the segment Mini Monsters along with his large crow assistant Cawfield.
- The Twilight Zone (1985–89) in the episode "A Day in Beaumont/The Last Defender of Camelot" (1986), Merlin was played by Norman Lloyd.
- 3-2-1 (1978–87) a British game show; in the episodes "The Magic of Merlin and Egypt", Merlin was played by Kenneth Connor.
- ThunderCats (1985–89), an American animated television series; in the episode "Excalibur" (1985), Merlin was voiced by Earl Hammond.
- Mr. Merlin (1981–82), an American sitcom starring Barnard Hughes as the wizard disguised as Max Merlin, a mechanic in modern-day San Francisco.
- Read All About It! (1979–81), a Canadian educational television series; in the episode "'Tis Magic", Merlin was played by John Dee.
- The Legend of King Arthur (1979), a British television fantasy series; Merlin is played by Robert Eddison.
- Tarzan and the Super 7 (1978–80), an American morning cartoon series; Merlin is voiced by Michael Bell.
- Once Upon a Classic (1976–80), an American television program; in the episode "A Connecticut Yankee in King Arthur's Court" (1978), Merlin was played by Roscoe Lee Browne.
- Shadows (1975–78), a British supernatural television anthology series; in the episode "The Boy Merlin" (1978), Merlin was played by Ian Rowlands. A 1979 TV series, The Boy Merlin, was later based on that episode, with Rowlands reprising the role of Merlin.
- Carry on Laughing (1975), a British television comedy series; in the episodes "Short Knight, Long Daze and Under the Round Table", Merlin was played by Peter Butterworth.
- The Ghost Busters (1975), an American children's sitcom; in the episode "Merlin, the Magician", Merlin was played by Carl Ballantine.
- The Time Tunnel (1966–67), an American science-fiction TV series; in the episode "Merlin the Magician" (1967), Merlin was played by two actors, Christopher Cary and Dennis Christopher.
- The Adventures of Superboy (1966–69), an American animated series; in the episode "The Black Knight" (1966), Merlin is one of the antagonists of the story, jealous of Superboy's powers.
- The Man from U.N.C.L.E. (1964–68), an American spy-fiction television series; in the episode "The Foxes and Hounds Affair" (1965), Merlin (a stage magician capable of reading minds) was played by Andre Philippe.
- Richard the Lionheart (1961–65), a British children's TV-show; in the episode "King Arthur's Sword" (1962), Merlin was played by Ferdy Mayne.
- Startime (1959–60), an American anthology series and one of the first American TV shows to broadcast in color; in the episode "Tennessee Ernie Ford Meets King Arthur" (1960), Merlin was played by Carl Ballantine.
- The David Niven Show (1959), an American television anthology series; in the episode "A Day of Small Miracles", Merlin was played by Eddie Bracken.
- The Adventures of Sir Lancelot (1956–57), a British television series; Merlin played by Cyril Smith.
- Kraft Television Theatre (1947–58), an American drama/anthology television series; in the episode "A Connecticut Yankee in King Arthur's Court" (1953), Merlin was played by Victor Jory.
- Studio One (1947–58), an American radio and TV anthology drama series; in the episode "A Connecticut Yankee in King Arthur's Court" (1952), Merlin was played by Salem Ludwig.
- Biker Mice from Mars (1993), an American animated series; appears in the episode "Biker Knights of the Round Table".
- The Star Trek: The Original Series episode "Requiem for Methuselah" featured a 6000-year-old human who lived as many aliases, including Merlin and other historical figures.
- Unicorn: Warriors Eternal (2023), an American animated series focused around the titular "Order of the Unicorn", a group of magical warriors assembled by Merlin that reincarnate across multiple eras in history to battle an immortal evil entity that was once Morgan LeFay. Merlin was voiced by Jeremy Crutchley.

== Other cultural references ==
- In Puck's Song, at the beginning of Puck of Pook's Hill, Kipling calls England "Merlin's Isle of Gramarye".
- John le Carré's 1974 spy novel Tinker Tailor Soldier Spy focuses on "Source Merlin", the code name of an agent supposedly providing British Intelligence with high-level information on the Soviets. The source is sponsored under an operation codenamed "Witchcraft". The code names were evidently chosen to emphasize the superb quality of the information provided "magically" by "Merlin". The protagonist, George Smiley, eventually proves that this "Merlin" is far from a wondrous magician.
- In the historical mystery novel Sovereign by British author C. J. Sansom, conspirators seeking to overthrow King Henry VIII of England make use of a prophecy attributed to Merlin that calls Henry VIII evil and illegitimate and foretells his rise and his highly deserved fall. This supposed prophecy was distributed by broadsheets despite the harsh punishment meted out to anyone caught spreading it.
- In Kingsman, the fictional secret service featured in the Kingsman comic series and the film franchise, each agent bears the name of an Arthurian character. "Merlin" is an older, wise agent who acts as a mentor to younger agents and who sacrifices his life so that the others may survive and successfully complete their vital mission.

== See also ==
- List of works based on Arthurian legends
- Morgan le Fay in modern culture
