= Michiel van den Bos =

Dutch composer (born 1975)

- Also known as: M.C.A., Mike Boss
- Born: Michiel van den Bos; 23 May 1975 (age 51)
- Origin: Rotterdam, Netherlands
- Genres: Electronica, orchestral music, ambient
- Occupations: Composer, musician, DJ
- Instruments: Keyboards, guitar, PC
- Years active: 1996–present
- Label: Materia Collective
- Website: Michiel van den Bos (YouTube)

Michiel van den Bos (born 23 May 1975), is a Dutch musician and electronic composer. He has composed soundtracks for over 20 games including Unreal, Deus Ex, Sonic, and the Age of Wonders series. He is also known as M.C.A. in the demoscene and tracker community. Van den Bos also performs as an indie/alternative DJ under the name Mike Boss.

== Early life ==
Michiel van den Bos was born in Rotterdam on 23 May 1975. He attended the former Caland Lyceum in Rotterdam. Since childhood, he wanted to become a composer, and he started making music with the Commodore 64 and the Amiga in the 1980s. He learned to play piano and guitar as a hobby, and performed as a guitarist in several bands. At the age of 19, he experienced some upheaval and moved house four times following the death of his father.

== Career ==
=== 1990s ===
From the early 1990s, Van den Bos composed under the alias MCA, as part of the group 'Vicious'. He later transitioned from demoscene composer to writing music for video games. He worked full time at a games store and a DVD/Laserdisc store, while overcoming the limitations of Impulse Tracker, to make soundtracks for Unreal, Unreal Tournament, and Age of Wonders based on textual map descriptions. Around this time, he was hired to compose music for Epic Games' Unreal and Triumph Studios and was given complete creative freedom. Van den Bos worked closely with Alex Brandon on the Unreal soundtrack and wrote an adaptive score. However, for Unreal Tournament, they received direction from Cliff Bleszinski, and handed in songs to spec.

=== 2000s ===
Van den Bos composed four tracks for the original Deus Ex of Ion Storm CD with the Impulse Tracker in 2000. He declined an offer to compose OSTs for Age of Wonders 2 and Age of Wonders: Shadow Magic due to the death of his mother. At 27, he founded his own company and was then hired by Triumph Studios to make music for the Overlord series. Since 26 March 1999, Van den Bos has posted over 60 tracker music files on the Mod Archive. The module files are mainly of Unreal, Unreal Tournament and Age of Wonders.

=== 2010s ===
In 2012, Van den Bos collaborated with other composers for One Big Album, a charity album, of which 80% of the proceeds were evenly donated between Starlight Children's Foundation and Save the Children. Subsequently, he scored music for various mobile games. Most notable are Hardlight's Sonic Jump, Sonic Dash and Sonic Jump Fever. Van den Bos returned to the Age of Wonders franchise with Planetfall in 2019.

=== 2020s ===
In 2020, Van den Bos collaborated with Alex Brandon to reimagine iconic songs of Deus Ex for the album Conspiravision: Deus Ex Remixed to celebrate the 20th anniversary. Van den Bos made the full OST of Age of Wonders 4 which released in 2023. It is composed predominantly of completely new material with a few nods to legacy songs. In 2023, Van den Bos crafted the music for mobile game Sonic Dream Team. On 15 May 2023, Van den Bos released a composed and mixed lo-fi soundtrack called Age of Wonders 4 LoFi Fantasy which includes a few AoW 1 and 3 songs. Van den Bos made soundtracks for the AoW 4 expansions: Empires & Ashes (November 2023), and Eldritch Realms (June 2024).

== Musical style and influences ==
Van den Bos' musical style is primarily energetic electronica, natural orchestral and soundscapes. His speciality is music sequencing. His studio consists of multiple, custom built audio PCs with a myriad of high end sample packages. He uses high end music samples such as EastWest Sounds, Vienna Instruments, Steinberg, Cinesamples. Spectrasonics and Native Instruments.

Van den Bos' greatest musical influences are John Williams, Jerry Goldsmith, LTJ Bukem; Commodore 64 composers Martin Galway, Rob Hubbard, Jeroen Tel, Ben Daglish; metal bands Carcass, At the Gates, Insomnium; and electronic artists PFM, Underworld and Artemis.

Van den Bos is also an indie/alternative DJ with the alias Mike Boss. His debut EP was Taking the Fifth (deep house), followed by Drifting Through Static (techno), both released in 2014.

== Works ==
=== Composer ===
Video games
Title	Year	System	Notes
Unreal (and the mission pack, Return to Na Pali)	1998	Microsoft Windows, Mac OS	
Age of Wonders	1999	Microsoft Windows	
Unreal Tournament	1999	Windows, Linux, Classic Mac OS, PlayStation 2, Dreamcast	
Deus Ex	2000	Microsoft Windows, Mac OS, PlayStation 2	
Overlord	2007	Xbox 360, Microsoft Windows, PlayStation 3, OS X, Linux	
Overlord: Raising Hell	2008	Microsoft Windows, PlayStation 3, Xbox 360, OS X, Linux	
Overlord: Dark Legend	2009	Wii	
Overlord II	2009	Linux, OS X, Microsoft Windows, Xbox 360, PlayStation 3	
Jambo! Safari: Animal Rescue	2009	Wii, Nintendo DS	
Age of Wonders III	2014	Microsoft Windows, OS X, Linux	
Unreal Tournament (cancelled)	2014	Microsoft Windows, Mac OS, Linux	
Deus Ex: Revision	2015	Microsoft Windows	
Voidrunner	2017	Microsoft Windows	
Age of Wonders: Planetfall	2019	Microsoft Windows, PlayStation 4, Xbox One, MacOS	
The Stranger VR	2020	Microsoft Windows	
Age of Wonders 4	2023	PlayStation 5, Windows, Xbox Series X/S	

Mobile games
Title	Year	System	Notes
Flick Golf!	2010	Mobile	
Zombie Flick	2010	Mobile	
Cup stack	2011	Mobile	
Sonic Jump	2012	Mobile	
Samurai Beatdown	2012	Mobile	
Sonic Dash	2013	Mobile	
Icebreaker: A Viking Voyage	2013	Mobile	
Sonic Jump Fever	2014	Mobile	
ChuChu Rocket! Universe	2019	Mobile	
Sonic Dream Team	2023	Mobile	

=== Discography ===
Credits
Title	Year	Type	Notes
Deus Ex: Game of the Year Edition Soundtrack	2001	Appearance	
A history of Unreal Music	2006	Appearance	
One Big Album	2012	Collaboration	
Epic Games 20th Anniversary Original Soundtrack	2012	Appearance	
Taking the Fifth	2014	EP	
Drifting Through Static	2014	EP	
Conspiravision: Deus Ex Remixed	2020	Collaboration	
Age of Wonders 4 | LoFi Fantasy	2023	Remix	
Tournament Rematch: Unreal Tournament Remixed	2025	Collaboration	
