= Age of Wonders III =

2014 4X turn-based strategy video game

- Developer: Triumph Studios
- Publishers: Triumph Studios → Paradox Interactive
- Producer: Djurre van Dijk
- Designers: Lennart Sas; Arno van Wingerden; Arnout Sas
- Writer: Raymond Bingham
- Composer: Michiel van den Bos
- Series: Age of Wonders
- Engine: Creator Engine
- Platforms: Microsoft Windows, OS X, Linux
- Release: Microsoft Windows: WW: March 31, 2014; OS X, Linux: WW: April 14, 2015
- Genre: 4X turn-based strategy
- Modes: Single-player, multiplayer

Age of Wonders III is a 2014 4X turn-based strategy video game developed and published by Dutch developer Triumph Studios. It is the fourth game in the Age of Wonders series, following Age of Wonders, Age of Wonders II: The Wizard's Throne and Age of Wonders: Shadow Magic released in 1999, 2002, and 2003 respectively. It was released on March 31, 2014, through digital distribution, as well as through retail in select territories for Microsoft Windows. A port to Linux and OS X was released on April 14, 2015.

The game is set in a high fantasy fictional setting, where players take the role of a leader to explore the world, interacting with other races and kingdoms, both diplomatically and through warfare while progressively expanding and managing their empire. It features a new graphics engine for the series, in addition to an updated soundtrack. The gameplay has also been updated, featuring a new role-playing style leader class based system and interchangeable choices of strategy and appearances for each playable race. It also supports online and local multiple player modes and a level editor along with a new story driven single player campaign mode.

Age of Wonders III was critically and commercially successful, marking a revitalization of the series. A spin-off, Age of Wonders: Planetfall, was released in 2019. A direct sequel, Age of Wonders 4, released in 2023 to further commercial and critical success.

== Gameplay ==
An Elven city (left) with its own and rival armies placed on a world map view.

Age of Wonders III, like the previous games in the series is a turn-based strategy game set within a high fantasy universe where the player assumes the role of a political-military leader. Gameplay is 4X-based (explore, expand, exploit and exterminate) where players explore the world map, slowly building an empire through colonization, warfare and diplomacy with rival powers. New to III is the greater addition of role-playing game features, where players must first choose and customize their leader, all options are dependent on the player's chosen style of play. There are six available races in the initial release: humans, draconians, high elves, dwarves, orcs, and goblins, all that will determine the race of their empire with each having unique perks and abilities. The leader and empire is further shaped by the choice from skill sets based on traditional RPG classes along with further specializations and skills to select. Each leader class also has access to their own unique units with a distinct visual look based on their corresponding race, each to accommodate their own unique approach to strategy, both in combat and when managing their empire. On release there are six different classes a leader can be. The "Sorcerer" class emphasizes the use of magic for enchantments and summoning powerful units. The "Theocrat" derives from an organized religion based society including zealots followers and the use of holy spells and warriors. The "Rogue" favors less direct approaches to situations, employing stealth, thievery and manipulation as well as dark magic in diplomacy and warfare. The "Archdruid" channels the power of nature, using it to their advantage by being very self-sufficient and being able to call upon wild creatures. The "Dreadnought" leads a steampunk styled society, using large industry, machinery and gunpowder-based units like cannons and tanks. Finally the "Warlord" specializes in direct conflict and combat tactics, utilizing effective non-magic based units and abilities.

Leaders themselves and separate recruitable hero units will be able to gain experience and level up, while also being able to gain new equipment and powers. Players can also develop their alignment between good and evil based on their player's actions and the cultures the player absorbs into their empire, rather than race like the previous games in the series.

Cities themselves provide much of the resources, infrastructure and host to unit recruitment, spell casting and research to unlock more of both, requiring gold, mana and or research points respectively gained through said city prosperity while also exploration. Independent cities and units not immediately aligned to any player/leader are also present in the world map. Units that come from an unaffiliated city will fight to protect a city's domain and will not forget that they're tied to it. Many of these independent settlements aren't cities in the traditional sense, but can be alternative settlements for other races and creatures, like a giant's keep or an undead dwelling for example. A player can conquer these holdings, which will provide units like a city, or they can absorb them through diplomatic means by paying tribute with diplomatic and/or alignment standing affecting their own stance on the player. If the city retains its native population, the player can recruit units of other races besides their own while the player can at any time after absorbing a city into their empire migrate a different population to that city while also being an act of "evil" for their alignment. Different city races are affected by the type of terrain, determining how well they thrive, for example dwarves prefer mountainous landscapes over tropics. Migrating the population or the non-evil act of terraforming the landscape through spells can alleviate this. Quests can also be given to players by independent forces and cities, including but not limited to clearing out wild units and protecting their stronghold. Quests can grant the support of independent forces for player in addition to a reward such as gold or equipment, sometimes with the choice of either given to the player upon completion of the quest.

As in the case of the first game in the series, Age of Wonders III offers a story-driven campaign that is playable from two sides, the human-centric Commonwealth Empire and the Court of the High Elves. In addition to the campaign; single-player scenarios, online multiplayer, random map generation and a map editor are also available. The graphics of Age of Wonders III have also changed to a fully 3D perspective with camera control instead of the isometric view the series has utilized prior.

=== Combat ===
A Dreadnought army besieging an Archdruid's city walls. Battles take place on separate 3D battlefields on a hexagon-grid layout of movement.

When two rival players forces engage, either in open battle or during a siege of a city, combat takes place in a separate phase of gameplay within a hexagon grid-based 3D battlefield where units are designated movement and space. Each side can lead multiple armies into battle with up to six units per army, many represented by multiple soldiers forming ranks as a single combatant that reflect their overall health (as figures are killed, their combat ability does not diminish until the unit's health reaches zero) while others are shown as single yet stronger characters. Both sides take turns to move and utilize their units while also being able to grant abilities that can enhance their effectiveness in combat, including magical spells that can also be used to boost unit capabilities, summon in new units and call down potentially very devastating area of effect attacks. Spells that leaders have learnt are usable in every battle regardless of his or her presence while others require hero units to be present, spell usage being limited by their mana pool. Units can also make use of the battlefield environment, such as defensive walls during city sieges, foliage and being able to make use of a flanking manoeuvre where attacks from a units rear can be more effective.

Units are allocated "action points" used for attacking, defending/retaliating and using special abilities, separate from yet dependent on their choice of movement shown by colour coding their choice of hexes they can act within. For example, if a unit does not move during their turn, they can perform up to three actions with the surrounding hexes displayed as green to the player, whereas if they move, they would appear orange and could now only perform two actions and finally one with red hexes. Any remaining action points a unit has or does have carries over into the opposition's turn, always having at least one left regardless of how far the unit moved prior. These remaining action points can be used to retaliate against any attacks they received from enemy units during the opposing player's own turn. It is also possible to expend action points entirely, potentially leaving units unable to move and/or retaliate themselves. Other options include the ability to just sprint or guard, greatly raising movement and defense respectively and evoking various different status effects such as stuns and poisons and damage enemy units that move into adjacent hexes.

== Plot ==
Before the events of the first game, the elven court was decimated by humans, an invasive race new to the Blessed Continent at the time. The elves split into two factions. The son of the slain king Inioch, Meandor, led the dark elves and the Cult of Storms, a group that intended to wipe out the humans. Inioch's daughter, Julia, led the wood elves and the Keepers, a group which sought peaceful resolution. These factions and others clashed in the Valley of Wonders, around the ruins of the razed elven court. The High Elf race was founded many years later when Julia married a dark elf and reunited their two races. Meanwhile, the Commonwealth Empire began as a joining of races for mutual protection and the sharing of knowledge. Though it set out with benign intentions, once the Empire was through expanding, humans seized power and pushed forward with technology and commerce. The Commonwealth Empire means to sweep aside the old ways and assimilate the world. The Elven Court takes exception to this, and wants to rally the ancient races to stand in defense against imperial ambitions, hence the central conflict of Age of Wonders III.

=== Elven Court ===
The Elven Court Campaign follows the Rogue Elven Princess Sundren of House Inioch. During a meeting at the Council of Origins, Thannis is killed and Gamblag blames both Sundren and Thannis of treachery, declaring war on Sundren and joining the Commonwealth. With the help of the Arch Druid Reskar Shapechanger, Sundren manages to defeat Gamblag and recover the body of Thannis. Sundren and Reskar then proceed to establish a haven for Draconians, meeting the Goblin Theocrat Nomlik in these lands. With his help, along with the help of the Orcish Sorcerer Groshak, they manage to defeat all opposition in these lands, including a Commonwealth Dreadnought draining the lands. As Reskar rules over his haven, Sundren and Nomlik strike a serious blow at the Commonwealth by destroying the Commonwealth factories in Xablor Province and defeating the High Priest Voraditius, freeing many enslaved goblins in the province. At Thannis's funeral, the Elven king Saridas vows retribution against the Commonwealth and prepares for all-out war while Julia does not share his genocidal intentions. Afterwards, Sundren and her party heads to the Sapphire Archipelago to attack Isabella's pirate forces. After a few battles, Sundren meets Merlin, who reveals that the Shadowborn, a secretive organization of which Isabella is part of, planned to push the Elven Court and the Commonwealth towards war. Sundren is then given a choice: either she tries to stop the war and spare the humans at the risk of being marked renegade by the Elven Court or she remains loyal to the Elven Court and purges the Archipelago of all human presence and follows Saridas to all-out war, something that Nomlik won't like.

If Sundren chooses to stop the war, Groshak leaves her in disgust while she forms the Torchbearers, a third neutral party dedicated to hunting down the Shadowborn. Sundren offers peace to Isabella, but the shadowborn pirate rejects the proposal, leaving Sundren no choice but to rid the Sapphire Archipelago of her while sparing the human populations. She also frees Bormac Orcsbane, a Dwarven Dreadnought hero who becomes sympathetic to the Torchbearer cause. After defeating Isabella, Sundren, Nomlik, and Reskar follow Bormac eastward to establish a haven for Torchbearers. They encounter armies of Vontor and Leana, who are both loyal to Saridas and hostile due to Sundren's desertion, as well as the Shadowborn member Werlac. Leana soon reveals that Saridas is aware of Werlac's treachery and goes to war with him as well. After Werlac falls in battle, he proceeds to retreat from the region, leaving Sundren and her party to deal with the remaining opponents. They manage to defeat all of them just in time to reach the center of battlefield between the Elven Court and the Commonwealth. Merlin gives her a magic wand that gives the user the ability to reroute the throne teleport to a special holding place; his plan is to capture both King Saridas and Emperor Leonus in order to bring the war to the end. Together, Sundren and the Torchbearers, along with Edward Portsmith succeed and show the evidence about the Shadowborn to both leaders, and their animosities quickly fade. The Torchbearers proceeds to enter both the Commonwealth and the Elven Court to hunt down the remaining Shadowborn agents.

=== Commonwealth ===
The Commonwealth Campaign follows the Human Dreadnought Edward Portsmith. After taking the oath of command, he quells the rebellion at Brisska Province with the help of Emperor Leonus's niece, the Sorceress Laryssa Mirabilis. They then travel to the Haunted Nervinkiln to acquire Melenis's Power Source and drive out the Elven Sorcerer Werlac. There, they meet the Elven Warlord Valery and drop the Oscillator gem off at a Dwarven Outpost controlled by Commonwealth Dreadnoughts Drugal and Gormsog. Laryssa then proceeds to study the gem when she goes missing along with the gem, with Svengir being suspected of stealing the gem. As they approached him, Svengir reveals that he never stole the gem and Drugal and Gormsog reveal their allegiance to Svengir. Fending off attacks, they manage to defeat Svengir and both traitorous dwarves, only to find Laryssa and the gem not in the province. Laryssa is then revealed to have taken the gem with her and was branded a traitor after several diplomats sent to her were presumed to have been murdered by her. Edward is ordered to find and kill her, she was tracked to the ruins of Sunbirth Citadel. On the way, they meet the Orcish Rogue Sulthor and the Draconian Carishar, who claims to have been attacked by Laryssa. As Edward makes contact with Laryssa, she reveals her true intentions and Edward is given a choice: either join her and the Torchbearers to stop the war between the Commonwealth and Elven Court against Valery's wishes, or remain loyal to the Commonwealth and carry out her sentence.

If Edward chooses to side with Laryssa, Valery deserts him and reports his decision to Emperor Leonus, while Carishar immediately turns hostile to Edward and Laryssa. It soon becomes apparent that Carishar was the one who murdered the diplomats, in fact he is Werlac's personal enforcer of the Shadowborn. He was trying to rebuild the Shadowgate to restore the link between the world and the Shadow Realm. Following Carishar's defeat, Edward and Laryssa travel to the Sapphire Archipelago, where they meet with Sundren, the founder of the Torchbearers. They discover that several incidents between the Elven Court and the Commonwealth were plotted by the Shadowborn, with the desire to drive both sides to all-out war. While Sundren moves against Shadowborn agents in the Commonwealth, Edward, Laryssa, and Sulthor join the battle within the Rockshoal Isles, intent on establishing a safe haven for war refugees while serving as a base of operations to raise a force dedicated to stopping the imminent war. After defeating and/or allying with the warring factions on the isles, the Torchbearers swiftly position themselves in the center of the battlefield and with the power of Merlin's magic wand, both King Saridas of the Elven Court and Emperor Leonus of the Commonwealth are captured. Both are shown evidence of Shadowborn activity within their empires and their tempers for war quickly fade. While celebrations of the war's end are in progress, Torchbearer agents infiltrate the two empires to hunt down Werlac along with any surviving members of the Shadowborn.

== Development ==
Following a digital re-release of the original series of games, Age of Wonders III was later announced on February 6, 2013. Development first began in 2010, with many of the original developers of the previous games having returned, with development being led by studio founders Lennart Sas and Arno van Wingerden, while technical producer Djurre van Dijk and game designer Arnout Sas also returned. Ray Bingham is the story writer. Jimmy van der Have has been the chief liaison between the development team and the fan community on the official website, with further development also involving the use of regular journals and solicits feedback on the developer game site's official forum, allowing the community to be involved in the testing of the game. While a random map generator has been promised, additional tools for extensive, user-created content are available.

In February 2013, Markus "Notch" Persson, owner of Mojang and founding lead designer of the popular game Minecraft, was revealed as an investment partner in the development of Age of Wonders III. Triumph Studios got into contact with Mojang following the mention of their series with the random blurb for the title screen of Minecraft, leading them to show a demo of the current development stage at the time, including with other potential publishers. Lennart Sas at Triumph stated that "his biggest concern was that it would cost him a lot of time, so it helped that we made this sort of game before and were at an advanced stage of development". This eventually allowed the studio to opt to self-publish following further funding, being an unconventional approach to funding and publishing, without the use of Kickstarter like many sequels to other classic PC titles in development during that period. Persson himself is a fan of the previous Age of Wonders games and instead went on to help simply fund the development of III rather than having any publishing rights or ownership. His involvement would later be referenced within the game in the form of a recruitable hero called "Per Notchson" that resembles Persson.

=== Release ===
Though originally intended for release in late 2013, it was pushed back to early 2014 to allow for a greater investment of time and resources. The game was released worldwide on 31 March 2014, predominantly through digital distribution including online store platforms Steam and GOG.com, published by the developer themselves. Limited retail physical copies were planned to be published in Europe by third party publishers including EuroVideo who were publishing a "Limited Collector's Edition" with a figurine, soundtrack and digital content codes in central Europe while Techland were publishing a "Special Edition" with a guide and stickers, with Namco Bandai and Buka published standard retail copies in other European countries. The digital versions also have pre-purchase bonus missions as well as the option of a "Deluxe Edition" that comes with a digital copy of the soundtrack and a further additional mission.

=== Expansions ===
==== Golden Realms ====
An expansion titled "Golden Realms" was released on 18 September 2014 as digital downloadable content. The expansion features a new playable race, in the form of Halflings with their own unique units, buildings and abilities, utilizing a "luck mechanic" to aid in combat. The Halflings also have a dedicated story campaign, following the race's struggle and return from distant lands following a massacre of their kind from the point of view of the Halfling warlord Ernest Thistlewood. The expansion also features new wild/non-player locations and units, along with new relics and perks to discover and two standalone scenarios that utilize the new features, while all races gain defensive structures when defending in siege battles. New specializations and upgrades are also available, including unique civilization advancements that can only be used once per game by the first player to meet a certain criterion. A new mode called "Seals of Power" allows an additional victory condition where players must seize and defend a number of independently guarded seals randomly placed across each map.

==== Eternal Lords ====
A second expansion titled "Eternal Lords" was released on 14 April 2015 digitally, a year after the original game's release. This expansion is more substantial – featuring two new playable races, the humanoid ice dweller "Frostlings" and the bipedal-feline "Tigrans" from previous Age of Wonders. The second major addition is a new Necromancer class for all races who specializes in raising the dead, ghoul versions of race specific units and spreading disease. Both major additions come with further new units, abilities and play styles. The expansion also features new mechanics to the core gameplay such as new specializations for good, neutral and evil alignments including powerful new units and powers and considerations for race relations that can impact empire development and diplomacy. In addition, cosmic happenings that can alter or provoke players on the map and a new "Unifier" victory type for both randomly generated and new pre-set games where players must construct unity beacons in order to win. A new campaign story about the struggling Frostling kingdom from the point of view of the Frostling Necromancer Arvik the Dark incorporates the new elements, giving player choice throughout the story. A free update was also released alongside the second expansion to improve variety between the playable races such as race specific bonuses and unit updates.

== Soundtrack ==
The soundtrack of the game was composed by Michiel van den Bos, a Dutch musician and disc jockey who had previously worked on Triumph Studios' past developed titles including Overlord and Overlord II and first game in the Age of Wonders series, in addition to other studios' games including Unreal Tournament and Deus Ex. Many of the tracks from the original game were remade; Van den Bos noted that the newer technology available has allowed him to create these tracks as they "sounded in his head" when he was working on original Age of Wonders.

== Reception ==
Reception

Aggregate score
Aggregator	Score
Metacritic	80/100

Review scores
Publication	Score
Game Informer	7.5/10
GameSpot	7/10
IGN	7.1/10
Joystiq	4.5/5
PC Gamer (US)	83/100
Polygon	8/10
GameStar	82/100

Age of Wonders III received a positive reception on release. Adam Smith reviewing for Rock, Paper, Shotgun called Age of Wonders III "solidly constructed", praising the customization options and map generator for being able to "create interesting and attractive worlds", along with the battle system, calling it "cleverly... integrated". Maxwell McGee of GameSpot also enjoyed the combat, feeling it was "where Age of Wonders III really shines", calling them "tactically rewarding" in addition to "streamlined empire management", yet was critical of the initial releases familiarity between races, their units and how they play. Colin Campell reviewing for Polygon noted the degree of strategy within the gameplay, stating that "this is truly a grand strategy game; brains are a non-optional component to victory", positively commenting on the level of shifting difficulty and events throughout the average game before concluding that it is "tough to wield so much power, but control is hard-earned. As it should be".

Richard Cobbett of PC Gamer also noted the general streamlining of the gameplay yet still called it "far from an easy one... Age of Wonders III takes no prisoners in either its strategic or tactical game", with the core gameplay as being "immediately engaging" for players. Cobbett went on to mention certain comparisons to Civilization V, noting the emphasis strategic battles, that "Age of Wonders III isn't remotely trying to be Civ 5 and its pace and your ability to roll with the punches is to its credit", but in regards to other features in the 4X genre he was critical of them in the game as "feeling overly clipped". Joe Robinson of Strategy Informer also drew comparisons to Civilization V but felt the game was still "more creative with the fairly rigid 'Civ' template". Rowan Kaiser at IGN however was not favorable of the story campaign mode due to what he considered "too-huge maps and insta-fail conditions", instead preferring the "small, crowded maps that forced more tactical battles".

Reviews for the Golden Realms expansion were positive, with an average critic score of 82/100 on Metacritic. Tom Chick for Quarter to Three praised the addition of the Halflings and their unique gameplay compared to the other races and the new Seals of Power victory condition, calling it the "best-case scenario for how to do DLC". The Eternal Lords expansion similarly received a positive response, with a Metacritic score of 80/100. Daniel Starkey for GameSpot praised the new races and class and the variety they added to the base game and the addition role-playing elements, concluding the review by stating "strategy game legend and Civilization creator Sid Meier once said, 'Games are a series of interesting decisions'. By that metric, Age of Wonders III: Eternal Lords is excellent", yet in reference to McGee's earlier review for GameSpot wrote that it still "carries a few problems over from its core game".

By March 2016, Age of Wonders III had sold 500,000 copies.
