= Age of Wonders =

1999 video game

- Developers: Triumph Studios, Epic MegaGames
- Publishers: NA: Gathering of Developers; EU: Take-Two Interactive
- Director: Lennart Sas
- Designers: Lennart Sas, Arno van Wingerden
- Programmer: Arno van Wingerden
- Artists: Thomas Cardin, Roy Postma, Lennart Sas
- Writer: Raymond Bingham
- Composer: Michiel van den Bos
- Series: Age of Wonders
- Platform: Microsoft Windows
- Release: NA: November 11, 1999; EU: February 9, 2000
- Genre: Turn-based strategy
- Modes: Single-player, multiplayer

Age of Wonders is a 1999 turn-based strategy game co-developed by Triumph Studios and Epic MegaGames, and published by Gathering of Developers.

Age of Wonders underwent a long production cycle, and was originally developed under the name World of Wonders. In 1997, the team scrapped its existing work and restarted development, which resulted in Age of Wonders.

The game won positive reviews and was a moderate commercial success, with global sales of roughly 200,000 units by 2001. It began a franchise and was followed by five sequels: Age of Wonders II: The Wizard's Throne, Age of Wonders: Shadow Magic, Age of Wonders III, Age of Wonders: Planetfall, and Age of Wonders 4. In 2010, the first game was re-released on GOG.com and Steam.

== Gameplay ==
Age of Wonders is a turn-based strategy game that takes place from an isometric perspective, which consists of hexagonal tiles. Units are arranged into groups (also known as parties or stacks) of up to eight units; a single such group occupies one tile. Cities occupy between one and four tiles, and other structures generally occupy a single tile. Units within the game have a limited number of movement points, which are replenished at the beginning of each turn. Two turn systems are used—sequential (or "classic"), where players take their turns in order, or simultaneous, where all players can move units at once. In practice, actions in the latter system are added and executed via a queue.

The game has a single-player campaign, playable from two sides (more campaigns have been made by the community since release), and many maps, both included and user-created that can be played in Hotseat mode, over a LAN, on the Internet, or by email (PBEM). Up to 12 players can participate in a single game, depending on the map. Simultaneous turns are only available in single player and live multiplayer games; PBEM and hotseat games, and all combat, use the sequential turn system.

Each player leads a certain race. There are 12 races available in the game, though not all of them may be present on every map, and of those which are, not all may be playable. List of races includes traditional fantasy Elves, Lizardmen, Humans, Goblins, Dark Elves, Undead, Orcs, Dwarves and Halflings, as well as several unique ones such as Frostlings, Azracs, and Highmen. Races, as well as units not belonging to any specific race, such as dragons and giants, have a certain alignment, which can be good, neutral, or evil. According to their alignment and certain other factors, cities and independent units of one race can be friendly or hostile towards another race. This can manifest itself in different ways; for example, an orc city is not likely to surrender to the elves, and if conquered, may revolt unless there is a strong military presence in it to oppress the population. Units of hostile races forced to fight alongside each other in a single group will have lower morale, and are more likely to desert. Race relations can be improved by acts of goodwill towards other races, such as upgrading their cities, or hampered by razing, looting, or migrating cities belonging to that race. Diplomacy can also affect this and even an alliance with one race might affect the relation of another race. There are also several spells which have a global effect on race relations.

There are two resources, gold and mana. Gold is used to build units, buy heroes, cities and spells (in Wizard Towers), upgrade cities. Mana is used to cast and research spells and use altars. Units can be built in cities, which can be further upgraded to produce more advanced units. Also, wandering independent (not belonging to any player) groups of units can be hired, if they are well-disposed towards the player. Units may have different strength, reflected by their level, which can vary from 1 to 4. Units under player control require a certain amount of gold every turn as an upkeep, the size of which depends upon the level of the unit. Summoned units use mana for upkeep instead of gold. Units earn experience for killing other units. The amount of experience earned depends on the number of enemy units killed as well as their level - the level of the enemy killed is the amount of experience gained. Upon earning a certain amount of experience, the unit gets a silver medal, and later on a gold one. Higher level units require more experience to earn medals. Units with medals also get slight increases to their basic parameters, or otherwise improve their combat performance.

A special type of unit, a hero, can only be hired when they appear at random at one of the player's cities. Heroes earn experience points just like all other units do; however, instead of getting medals for it, they gain levels to a maximum of level 30. Upon reaching the next level, they get a number of skill points, which a player can then spend to improve their parameters and teach them special abilities. This point system is similar to that used in many role-playing video games. In addition to that, heroes are the only units in the game which can learn the Spell Casting special ability, allowing them to cast spells. The Spell-Casting special ability can be upgraded from level I to level V. Each level provides more mana income/research points and also improves the channeling points allowing the hero to cast more/better spells each turn. Some spells require many turns to cast even with level V Spell-Casting. Heroes can not work together to cast one spell - each must cast it individually. Unlike common units, heroes can be brought from dead by magical means, although such experience will greatly decrease their morale.

Scattered across the board are a series of structures known as altars. These altars harness different types of magic and can be used as large-scale weapons. To fire off an altar, a player must first take control of it, then target a spot on the board (within a certain range), then click to cast the spell over the targeted area. Altars require 500 mana to fire. Each turn, they accumulate 50 mana charge, requiring 10 turns to fully recharge. Players with enough mana crystals may fire an altar multiple times sequentially without recharging.

Spells are divided into three types - unit spells which enhance a single unit, combat spells which are used to directly damage or handicap the enemy during combat, and global spells which can affect terrain, structures and groups of units on the global map, or summon magical creatures to player's aid. All have different mana costs depending on how advanced they are, and some of the more powerful unit and global spells can take more than one turn to cast. Counterspells to block and dispel unit and global enchantments are also available. Each spell furthermore belongs to one of the eight spheres of magic: Life, Death, Air, Earth, Fire, Water, Cosmos and Secret/Chaos. Mana, the magical energy required to research and cast spells, is channeled from magic nodes. Some of those are generic, and provide equal (though small) amount to caster of any sphere. Others are linked to one of the elemental planes, and only channel a specific kind of energy; thus, a Fire node, for example, can only be used by a player who chose the Fire sphere. Heroes with Spell-Casting also generate mana, your King/Leader more so than others.

=== Combat ===
Combat is initiated by one player attempting to move a stack onto a hex occupied by another player. If the players are at war, the attacker has the option of selecting tactical combat, where the players move individual units on a small map representing the battlefield, or automatic ("fast") combat, where the computer determines how the battle would have taken place by weighing off each side's attack, defense and movement parameters. Tactical combat is only available on single player maps, against independent units in PBEM games, and (optionally) against human players in live multiplayer games. Both forms of combat use the sequential turn system.

Spells may be cast during combat, though global spells are disabled. Combat spells may target a unit or a group of units of the enemy collectively, damaging or temporarily handicapping them. Handicaps are usually introduced alongside direct damage, and vary from short-term paralysis to poisoning or a curse. Most spells have a maximum range. All ranged attacks (including some types of spells), and some melee strikes can result in friendly fire. For example, an archer firing an arrow at a target can hit and injure a friendly unit if it is on the line of fire. Trees, buildings and other obstacles scattered around combat maps also hamper ranged attacks as well as movement to various degrees, and can be used to one's advantage to great effect.

Unit parameters and special abilities play a heavy role in combat. Attack is matched against target's defence to determine whether a hit was scored, and then damage determined the number of hit points the target loses. Some offensive spells have to beat the target's resistance instead, or even both defence and resistance. Physical attacks (such as archery) target defence, while other attacks (such as venomous spit) target resistance. Equal values of the attacker and the defender parameters results in a 50% chance to hit, and for each point of difference this is changed by 10% (but to a minimum of 10%, or a maximum of 90%). While most commonly only physical damage is dealt, sometimes attacks are partially or fully magical in nature, and can result in additional negative effects on the target: a fire strike has a chance of setting the target aflame, a lightning strike can paralyse the target, and so on. At the same time, units often have protection and/or immunity against specific forms of attacks. Protection reduces the damage of that effect by 50% e.g. lightning bolts with marksmanship II (a skill to improve attack/damage of a ranged attack) has 7 attack 4 damage, but would do a maximum of 2 damage against a unit with lightning protection, and none against a unit with lightning immunity.

== Development ==
Age of Wonders underwent a long development cycle. CNET Gamecenter's Mark Asher joked that it had "been in development ever since programming a computer was a matter of punching holes in cards". It was originally developed under the name World of Wonders for MS-DOS, and was later upgraded for Windows 95. The team ultimately scrapped this version of the game in 1997, leading to the final released version of Age of Wonders. The game originally incorporated several role-playing video game elements that were dropped when simultaneous turns were implemented.

The music files within Age of Wonders are in Impulse Tracker (.IT) format and were composed by Michiel van den Bos, who has also composed for other notable titles such as Deus Ex and the Unreal series of games. There are 20 tunes in the main gameplay, and also 4 other tunes to accompany different situations within gameplay. The 21st tune called "In The Company of Elves" was included with the demo version of Age of Wonders, but not with the final release of the game. In the demo version all songs beside the title song were in the Scream Tracker (.s3m) format.

== Reception ==
Reception

Aggregate score
Aggregator	Score
GameRankings	82%

Review scores
Publication	Score
CNET Gamecenter	8/10
Computer Games Strategy Plus	4/5
Computer Gaming World	4/5
Eurogamer	9/10
Game Informer	7.75/10
GameFan	85%
GamePro	3.5/5
GameRevolution	B+
GameSpot	8.6/10
GameSpy	87%
IGN	8.8/10
Next Generation	5/5
PC Accelerator	8/10
PC Gamer (US)	91%

The game received favorable reviews according to the review aggregation website GameRankings. IGN reviewer Jason Bates wrote, "if you are at all interested in turn-based strategy games with a fantasy theme, go get this game". Bates praised many of the game's features including the graphics, gameplay mechanics, editor, and online connectivity, but said the music was uninspiring and called the sound effects "serviceable but bland". AllGame's Nick Woods wrote: "If you love strategy and role playing games, Age of Wonders is worth the purchase", giving it three-and-a-half stars out of five. However, GameZone's Jason Lambert gave it 6.3 out of 10, writing: "Small flaws and annoyances made this game a little less than expected. If you are wanting to play something different than the Heroes of Might and Magic, Warlords, or the new Disciples, then you may want to try this game. If you are happy with what you are currently playing, then save your money and buy your mom a Christmas present". Greg Vederman of NextGen wrote that "Age of Wonders stands tall as one of the best games of the year".

Domestically, the game sold 20,975 copies by April 2000, and totaled 71,000 copies by October 2001. Its global sales had reached roughly 200,000 units by March 2001. At the time, PC Player noted that Age of Wonders was "not necessarily one of the biggest sellers in gaming history", but that its commercial performance was adequate to justify a sequel.

PC Gamer US and CNET Gamecenter nominated the game for their 1999 "Best Turn-Based Strategy Game" awards, both of which ultimately went to Sid Meier's Alpha Centauri. The staff wrote that the former game "took the tired fantasy-based theme we've seen time and again and breathed new life into it".

== Legacy ==
Age of Wonders began the Age of Wonders series. It was followed by five sequels: Age of Wonders II: The Wizard's Throne, Age of Wonders: Shadow Magic, Age of Wonders III, Age of Wonders: Planetfall and Age of Wonders 4.

=== Modding ===
The Age of Wonders came with a basic map editing utility "AoWEd", that allows players to create their own scenarios or to edit existing scenarios included in the game. Scenario makers (also referred to as 'mapmakers') were able to draw maps with rich stories from their own imaginations, or took inspiration from classic fantasy worlds such as that of Tolkien, Dungeons & Dragons, etc. Many of such carefully crafted scenarios have been touted as being of higher quality than that which came with the game. Having scenario makers actively utilising the AoWEd to make new scenarios meant that players were almost never in short supply of new maps to try out and enjoy. Custom made scenarios were also often used in multiplayer / PBEM tournaments. Thus, the AoWEd was largely responsible for keeping the fans of the game entertained until the release of the sequel, Age of Wonders 2.

The AoWEd was also used to generate the maps for the free online multiplayer game Battlemaster. The first mod released was known as Warlock's Ruleset, after the player who created it. The mod changed some in-game costs and added new units and structures. Since the accidental release of the developer's editor (known as DevEd), many more mods have been made by the fan community (notably at HeavenGames), including the very popular "Lighthawk's Rules". However, there are some aspects of the game that can only be changed by use of a hex editor.

=== Development ===
AoW was developed using the Delphi programming language (Delphi 4) and later upgraded to Delphi 5 for AoW II.
