= Age of Wonders (series) =

Video game franchise

- Genre: 4X turn-based strategy
- Developers: Triumph Studios; Epic MegaGames
- Publishers: Gathering of Developers; Take-Two Interactive; Triumph Studios; Paradox Interactive
- Platforms: Microsoft Windows, OS X, MacOS, Linux, PlayStation 5, PlayStation 4, Xbox Series X and Series S, Xbox One
- First release: Age of Wonders; October 31, 1999
- Latest release: Age of Wonders 4 May 2, 2023

Age of Wonders is a series of 4X turn-based strategy and tactical combat video games. The series is known for its rich universe of fantasy, magic, epic battles and deep customization. All games were developed by Triumph Studios while AoW 1 was co-developed with Epic MegaGames.

Michiel van den Bos composed the soundtracks of most AoW games except The Wizard's Throne and Shadow Magic were done by Mason B. Fisher.

== Releases ==
Release timeline
1999	Age of Wonders
2000–2001
2002	Age of Wonders II: The Wizard's Throne
2003	Age of Wonders: Shadow Magic
2004–2013
2014	Age of Wonders III
2014	Age of Wonders III - Golden Realms
2015	Age of Wonders III - Eternal Lords
2016–2018
2019	Age of Wonders: Planetfall
2019	Age of Wonders: Planetfall - Revelations
2020	Age of Wonders: Planetfall - Invasions
2020	Age of Wonders: Planetfall - Star Kings
2021–2022
2023	Age of Wonders 4
2023	Age of Wonders 4 - Empires & Ashes
2024	Age of Wonders 4 - Eldritch Realms
2025	Age of Wonders 4 - Giant Kings
2025	Age of Wonders 4 - Archon Prophecy
2025	Age of Wonders 4 - Thrones of Blood
2026	Age of Wonders 4 - Rise from Ruin
2026	Age of Wonders 4 - Secrets of the Archmages

Year	Title	Platform(s)		
Year	Title	Console	Computer	Handheld
Main series
1999	Age of Wonders	-	Windows	-
2002	Age of Wonders II: The Wizard's Throne	-	Windows	-
2003	Age of Wonders: Shadow Magic	-	Windows	-
2014	Age of Wonders III	-	Windows; OS X; Linux	-
2023	Age of Wonders 4	PlayStation 5; Xbox Series X/S	Windows	-
Expansion packs
2014	Age of Wonders III - Golden Realms	-	Windows; OS X; Linux	-
2015	Age of Wonders III - Eternal Lords	-	Windows; OS X; Linux	-
2023	Age of Wonders 4 - Empires & Ashes	PlayStation 5; Xbox Series X/S	Windows	-
2024	Age of Wonders 4 - Eldritch Realms	PlayStation 5; Xbox Series X/S	Windows	-
2025	Age of Wonders 4 - Giant Kings	PlayStation 5; Xbox Series X/S	Windows	-
2025	Age of Wonders 4 - Archon Prophecy	PlayStation 5; Xbox Series X/S	Windows	-
2025	Age of Wonders 4 - Thrones of Blood	PlayStation 5; Xbox Series X/S	Windows	-
2026	Age of Wonders 4 - Rise from Ruin	PlayStation 5; Xbox Series X/S	Windows	-
2026	Age of Wonders 4 - Secrets of the Archmages	PlayStation 5; Xbox Series X/S	Windows	-
Spin-offs
2019	Age of Wonders: Planetfall	PlayStation 4; Xbox One	Windows; OS X	-
Expansion packs
2019	Age of Wonders: Planetfall - Revelations	PlayStation 4; Xbox One	Windows; OS X	-
2020	Age of Wonders: Planetfall - Invasions	PlayStation 4; Xbox One	Windows; OS X	-
2020	Age of Wonders: Planetfall - Star Kings	PlayStation 4; Xbox One	Windows; OS X	-

== Main series ==
=== Plot ===
==== The First Age: Age of Wonders ====
Long ago, before the First Age, the Dragons were born on Athla during its creation and shaped the primordial planet. The Giants came later to shape the details of the world. They frequently changed what the dragons made which caused animosity between these ancient races. Eventually, the humans were expelled from the Garden realm and endured terrible conditions on harsh worlds. The Archons (called Highmen in AoW 1 and Archons in sequels) felt remorse since humans were their ancestors. So the Archons forged a long-term plan to guide the humans. They used holy magic with powerful spells to conquer Athla and populated it with mainly the Elves and other races. The Archons made a deal that the Elves would make Athla habitable for humans and the Elves were required to leave Athla once the humans arrived.

In 0 LIR (Lord Inioch's Reign), Inioch is crowned Wizard King of the Elven Kingdom (Verdant Kingdom) when his father retires to Evermore. Inioch rules as a supreme monarch from the Valley of Wonders over all other races in the Blessed Continent on Athla. He keeps a delicate yet fragile balance of power between the old races such as the Elves, Dwarves and Orcs. The Elven Court of House Inioch consists of scholarly members called The Keepers who maintain order and peace for all fair races of the Blessed Continent.

In 800 LIR, the Archons descend from the Heavens to Athla and visit the Elven Court (Verdant Court). Inioch keeps communications between the Elven Court and the Archons a secret, but forms a political coalition with all the races to welcome newcomers. The Archons depart in 801 LIR to their Garden.

By 878 LIR, after 8 years of pregnancy Eleanor (Inioch's first wife) gives birth to a son Meandor, but Eleanor dies in childbirth. By 898 LIR, Inioch marries his second wife Elwyn, yet Meandor finds the hasty marriage insulting and resents Elwyn. In 962 LIR, the humans are banished from their Garden. The first vessels with human refugees travel across the sea and arrive at the Blood Isles. The Elves complain about this new invasive race which overwhelms the islands. The humans migrate further and reach the shores of the Blessed Continent by 964 LIR. The Keepers convince Inioch to grant the humans the Grey River Basin in the Elven Kingdom on the stipulation that the humans respect the Kingdom's balance and edicts. By 965 LIR, the human settlement suffers from Goblin and Orc raiders, yet the Elven Court is reluctant to help. The oppressed humans suspect it was caused by the Court and seek alternative allies. In 969 LIR, Queen Elwyn gives birth to a daughter named Julia.

The Elves have grown fond of Athla and break the deal with the Archons by refusing to leave the planet. Instead, the Elven Court seeks to integrate the humans into the Elven Kingdom. The big influx of human migrants has diminished the life comforts of the Kingdom's inhabitants. The humans dislike the strict Elven rule over their settlements. The once magical and peaceful era deteriorates to turmoil with a struggle for survival. By 969 LIR, the Humans discover evidence suggesting that the plagues and persecutions against the human colonies are funded by factions within the Elven Court. By 970 LIR, the rebellious humans and their allies declare war on the Elven Kingdom. The Keepers help Queen Elwyn and princess Julia escape the Elven Court. Meandor allies with a secret faction of rebels called the Dark Elves. The Elven Court is sacked by the humans. Meandor is gravely injured and left for dead. However, several weeks later he escapes and joins the Dark Elves. By 971 LIR, the Humans claim the whole Valley of Wonders. Those who refuse human sovereignty are driven out of the Valley. The Keepers make a temporary non-aggression pact to allow the Elves including Elwyn and Julia to escape from the Valley of Wonders. The evil races spread unchecked and the Undead are awakened. The surviving Elves split in two factions; The Keepers (Wood Elves) and the Cult of Storms (Dark Elves). In 989 LIR, the Cult of Storms loses multiple battles vs the humans and seditious leaders hurt the faction, but most evil races are under their control. By 993 LIR the humans retaliate to the terror of the Dark Elves, and mistakenly attack the Wood Elves assuming they're the same. In 999 LIR, the half Elves donate the island of Aldor to the Elves (near the westcoast of the Blessed Continent). Queen Elwyn founds a new Court with the United Cities. In 1000 LIR, the old alliances falter splinter. Meandor and Julia both claim the Verdant Throne. In 100 LIR, the Orcs come to the surface from the caves at Toadstool Vale to plunder the areas. The Dwarves leave the region for safety at Deepmir. In 1020 LIR, Meandor, unleashes terror with the goblins and orcs to seize the Valley of Wonders and destroy any opposition. The sacred Heartwood Forest is mostly burned by forest fires. In 1102 LIR, the Undead rise and attack the lands of Athla. In 1146 LIR, the Archons return to form an Alliance with the Elves and Humans and defeat the Undead. By 1152 LIR, the Archons leave again except a few guards at destructive nodes. In 1163 LIR, the severely defeated Undead leader Igor is in need of new troops so he lures the Goblins and Orcs to his Stronghold, but Igor gets caught in the middle and is destroyed.

1164 LIR, the Cult of Storms signs non-aggression treaties with the Undead and necromancers join their faction. 1172 LIR, The Keepers' attempts to establish a new alliance fails. Dwarves and Elves battle versus Dark Elves and Orcs for control of Thinreed Lake. 1194 LIR, Meandor allies with the Goblins. In 1204 LIR, Julia becomes the leader of The Keepers after a decisive victory against the Goblins. A decade of peace passes until 1216 LIR; a Cult of Storms agent assassinates Queen Elwyn. Meandor is seen searching for something among the skeletons at the Court Ruins. Julia, The Keepers and a chosen hero advance to reclaim the Valley of Wonders.

In Age of Wonders (1999), The Keepers, led by Julia, seek peace with the humans and to thwart Meandor's plans for a New World Order. Meandor and The Cult of Storms want to resurrect his father, reclaim the Verdant Throne and exterminate the humans. The player makes campaign choices with 6 possible storylines and 4 endings. In the canonical story branch; the Halflings join the Keepers, side with the Dwarves and Elves to stop the Cult of Storms.

==== The Second Age: The Wizard's Throne, Shadow Magic ====
The Wizard's Throne (2002) continues several centuries later. It introduces the Circle of Evermore (Wizard's Circle) which consists of 6 spheres with each 2 wizards (Yaka, Nimue, Arachna, Fangir, Artica, Karissa etc.). Garbiel of the Cosmos sphere is abandoned by the other wizards and then recruits Merlin to rally the wizards who left the Wizard's Circle. Inioch's spirit promises power to the wizards if they resurrect him. The wizards plan to use his daughter Julia as a vessel for Inioch. The world is on the brink of collapse thus the player must restore the Circle of Evermore to balance the elemental forces.

In Shadow Magic (2003), the Circle of Evermore is restored, but a magical cataclysm attracts Shadow Demons from the void. They want to consume the mana and magical powers of every wizard in Athla. The wizards tap into powerful forces such as the Shadow Demons to win the war. When the Shadow Demons strike Evermore, Merlin gets trapped in the Shadow World. He communicates with allies via the elusive spirit Teryn. The frightened humans join Phobius to prosecute the old races and abolish magic. They establish the Phobian Empire to rule over the Blessed Continent. The magic vacuum enables the Shadow Demons to expand and devour souls. The siblings Julia and Meandor of House Inioch put aside their rivalry to collaborate with Merlin and his Syron allies to save Athla. Their efforts results in the fall of Phobius. The enslaved people are freed from the Shadow Demons when they defeat their leader, the All-Devourer.

In between the sequel, a large group of dark elves led by Meandor goes to the Shadow Realm to battle the remaining Shadow Demons. Wizards such as Yaka, Karissa, Nimue, Meandor and the Archons leave Athla to explore the Shadow Realm for treasure. Merlin seals the World Gates which prevents them from returning to Athla.

==== The Third Age: AoW III ====
Age of Wonders III (2014) is a lower magic era. Julia marries Saridas (First Stormlord of the Dark Elves) and performs a ceremony which reunites the light and dark Elves to restore the High Elves. Julia and Saridas have a son Thannis and a daughter Sundren. The High Elves, led by Julia and Saridas, reinstate Inoch's Elven Court to oppose the Empire of the Commonwealth. The Commonwealth started as multiple races with mutual defense and later the humans seized power with their technology and commerce. They demand that the High Elves surrender their lands for the benefit of all other races. However, Saridas claims the western region of the Blessed Continent as part of the Elven Court. The High Elves appoint Elven lords for the Court and elect King Saridas and Queen Julia as their monarchs. The capital Sylvanus is in the north west near Trollrock Woods. To the south is the Serpent River, Blackwater Lake and the Sobek Peninsula. to the west is the island Aldor. The Elven Court is surrounded by ocean except the eastern land border with the Valley of Wonders. The expanding Commonwealth is ruled from the capital Stronghelm. It occupies nearly half of the Blessed Continent and shares a western border with the Valley of Wonders.

Emperor Leonus Degrance steers the expansion of the Commonwealth to assimilate every continent. The High Elves take a stand against the Commonwealth to preserve the old races. A conniving cult called the Shadowborn conspires to ferment a war between the Empire of the Commonwealth and the kingdom of the High Elves. Sundren and the Imperial Dreadnaught Edward Portsmith form a group called The Torchbearers to prevent the war. The second goal is to unite the people of Athla against the Shadowborn. They receive help from Julia and Merlin to force Saridas and Leonus to sign a peace treaty. However, they can't stop the Shadowborn from breaking the seals of the World Gates. AoW III has 4 story-driven campaigns: The Elven Court, The Commonwealth, Golden Realms, and Eternal Lords.

==== The Fourth Age: AoW 4 ====
In Age of Wonders 4 (2023), the banished Wizard Kings were corrupted for centuries by the Torment of Shadows in the Eldritch realms. The broken seals of the World Gates no longer protect Athla from magical threats in the Astral Sea. Raw forces of magic flow freely again on the planet. The cosmic currents reshaped the land for a new genesis. The empires of the Third Age disintegrated. The Wizard Kings reclaim their former realms and return to Athla to rule as gods over mortals. Mortal champions must explore the Valley of Wonders and rebuild their realms. When the elder leader dies, a young champion inherits the throne and a Tome of Magic. Master forbidden arts and use Tomes of Magic evolve the people. The champion must repel the invasion of Yaka to ascend to Godirhood and the cosmic Pantheon. Overcome an unparalleled conflict with the Wizard Kings across numerous realms.

== Spin-offs ==
=== Planetfall ===
Planetfall (2019) is a sci-fi spin-off of the main fantasy series with different factions and lore.
