= L'Enchanteur =

French 1984 novel

- First edition cover
- Author: René Barjavel
- Language: French
- Publisher: Éditions Denoël
- Publication date: 1984
- Publication place: France
- Pages: 349
- ISBN: 2-207-22974-2

L'Enchanteur ("The Wizard") is a 1984 novel by the French writer René Barjavel. It tells the story of the Knights of the Round Table and the quest for the Holy Grail from the perspective of Merlin and his relationship with Viviane. Barjavel studied the Grail legend extensively. He added several new concepts in the Grail's backstory, placing its origin in the time of Adam and Eve. According to the novel, Eve used the cup to collect Adam's blood from the wound created when his rib was removed.

The novel was published in 1984 through éditions Denoël. The Arthurian Handbook (2nd ed., 1997) describes it as "among the best of the modern French adaptations of Arthurian legend".

== Plot ==
When the one true god came from Jerusalem to occupy the continent, the devil couldn’t pervert men anymore, so he impregnated a virgin with the goal of giving birth to an antichrist, but god, seeing that the child had inherited a pure heart from his mother, let him keep his devilish powers.

Now an adult, Merlin uses his powers to find a man of pure heart capable of finding the Aventureux Castle, guarded by an injured king, to bring back the Holy Grail and, with it, bring happiness and peace to man.

In his quest, he employs several knights who came together around King Arthur’s Round Table, those in whom Merlin placed the greatest hope; Arthur, Perceval, Lancelot of the Lake, and lastly Galaad. Their courage, sincerity, and above all love were subjected to the devil's difficult trials, and almost everyone failed at their quests. Merlin himself, despite all his powers and his forever youth, doubted, suffered and succumbed to the love of Viviane, the only one who saw Merlin's humanness, the only one who would love him for who he is.

== See also ==
- Fiction featuring Merlin
- King Arthur
- Knights of the Round Table
- List of Arthurian literature
- Perceval, the Story of the Grail
