= Enchanted, Inc. =

Enchanted, Inc
- Author: Shanna Swendson
- Cover artist: Nina Berkson
- Language: English
- Series: Katie Chandler
- Genre: Urban fantasy, romance
- Publisher: Ballantine Books
- Publication date: May 31, 2005
- Publication place: United States
- Pages: 320
- ISBN: 978-0-345-48125-2
- OCLC: 56590838
- Followed by: Once Upon Stilettos

Enchanted, Inc. is the first book in the "Katie Chandler" series of romantic urban fantasy novels by Shanna Swendson published in 2005.

== Plot summary ==
Kathleen "Katie" Chandler has been living and working in New York City for about a year, but is originally from Texas. She has a job under a boss named Mimi, but she hates it. She is offered a mysterious job. When she looks into it, it turns out that she is one of the 1% in the world who are immune to magic, and that the company offering her the job is a magic company called MSI Inc, which stands for Magic, Spells, and Illusions Inc. It soon becomes apparent that the world is in trouble from the evil wizard Phelan Idris and it is up to Katie and her friends to save it.

== Characters ==
Katie Chandler
A young Texas woman who has always been ordinary. She discovers that she is one of the rare people who has absolutely no magic in them and so magic can not be used on her. Because of this immunity she is recruited by MSI as a verifier. She can see through every spell or veiling without exception.

Owen Palmer
A shy, intelligent, powerful and gorgeous wizard who works for MSI. Owen works translating ancient spells. A former MSI employee, Phelan Idris, has a personal vendetta against him because Owen had him fired.

Rod Gwaltney
Owen's best friend since boyhood, Rod is a playboy who hides his not so attractive visage behind a very handsome illusion. He and Owen recruit Katie.

Merlin
The actual Merlin, from King Arthur. Merlin was woken from his enchanted sleep to help with some serious, imminent magical trouble. Merlin is very powerful and is fond of Katie, who teaches him about life in New York.

Phelan Idris
A former MSI employee who worked with Owen. Idris was fired for dabbling in dark magic. MSI is strictly good, and Owen was the one who reported him. Idris is now selling his own evil spells and Katie, Owen and Merlin have to stop him before it is too late.

Ethan Wainwright
A lawyer who specializes in intellectual property. Katie and Ethan met on a date (he was set up with one of her roommates) and started talking about law. After consulting with Merlin, Katie asks Ethan out, mostly to find out if they had an intellectual property case against Idris. On their date, Katie finds out that Ethan is an immune and recruits him to be a lawyer for MSI.

Sam
The head of security for MSI and also a gargoyle. Katie had been seeing him around the city for months before finding out that magic exists.

Marcia and Gemma
Katie's roommates. Normal humans in every way, except maybe a little brighter and more beautiful. Katie is not allowed to tell them about magic and that is fine with her, she needs some normality in her life. It does cause problems, though, when Katie needs to sneak away to battle evil magicians, or when her friends start dating former frogs she freed from enchantment.

== Reviews ==
Chick Lit Books website gave Enchanted Inc 5/5 stars and called it, "A fresh new entry into the new fantasy/paranormal chick lit genre."

Publishers Weekly called it, "Lively ... a pure and innocent fantasy ... a cotton candy read."

Melissa de la Cruz, author of The Au Pairs, called it "A totally captivating, hilarious and clever look on the magical kingdom of Manhattan, where kissing frogs has never been this fun."

Romantic Times Bookclub, June 2005 issue, wrote, "This is a witty, unique approach to the familiar story of a young woman working in modern Manhattan, and the laughs are plentiful." (4 stars)

Booklist, May 15, 2005, wrote, "This appealing novel offers a charming cast of characters and a clever premise, and readers will hope that Katie's skills will be needed in New York City again soon."

Dark Realms, issue #18, said, "... like the Harry Potter of adulthood. Author Shanna Swendson pens a delightful, whimsical tale about an unlikely heroine who saves the day against all odds -- and oddities. Enchanted, Inc. offers a wonderful escape from the ordinary."

Huntress Reviews aid, "The writing is superb and the story is seamless! Fans of Charlaine Harris's "Southern Vampire" series will especially enjoy this new author! A fun and witty read!" *****

Armchair Interviews rote, "Chick lit at its finest. Bridget Jones, move over. ... a delightful romp through the world of magic with a dash of romance thrown in for good measure. There are characters you'll love and remember."

== Film adaptation ==
Strike Entertainment was in pre-production of a film adaptation of Enchanted, Inc.. In January 2010, Steven Rogers was hired to write the screenplay. Rogers wrote the screenplays for the romantic comedies Hope Floats, P.S. I Love You and Kate & Leopold. The film is listed on IMDb as in development since 2011.

== The series ==
The "Katie Chandler" series (also called "Fairy Tales for Modern Times") has nine published books.

1. Enchanted, Inc. (May 2005, Ballantine Books, ISBN 978-0-345-48125-2)
2. Once Upon Stilettos (April 2006, Ballantine Books, ISBN 978-0-345-48127-6)
3. Damsel Under Stress (May 2007, Ballantine Books, ISBN 978-0-345-49292-0)
4. Don't Hex with Texas (April 2008, Ballantine Books, ISBN 978-0-345-49293-7)
5. Much Ado About Magic (September 2012, NLA Digital Liaison Platform LLC, ISBN 978-1-620-51052-0)
6. No Quest for the Wicked (October 2012, NLA Digital Liaison Platform LLC, ISBN 978-1-620-51056-8)
7. Kiss and Spell (May 2013, NLA Digital Liaison Platform LLC, ISBN 978-1-620-51078-0)
8. Frogs and Kisses (December 2016, NLA Digital Liaison Platform LLC, ISBN 978-1-620-51256-2)
9. Enchanted Ever After (July 2019, independently published, ISBN 978-1-079-31713-8)
