= Shanna Swendson =

American novelist

- Education: University of Texas at Austin
- Occupation: Novelist
- Writing career
- Pen name: Samantha Carter
- Period: 1993–present
- Genres: Romance, Chick lit
- Website: www.shannaswendson.com

Shanna Swendson is an American author of romance novels and chick lit. She has also written under the pseudonym Samantha Carter. Swendson is perhaps best known for the "Katie Chandler" series of novels, beginning with the 2005 publication of Enchanted, Inc.

== Biography ==
Although Swendson majored in broadcast news at the University of Texas at Austin, she enrolled in a wide variety of courses that she thought could help her become a successful novelist. These courses included fencing (useful for fantasy novels), the search for extraterrestrial life (useful for science fiction novels) and parageography (the geography of imaginary lands). After her graduation, Swendson worked in public relations and became serious about learning to write a novel, joining local writing organizations, and researching the novel-writing process. She completed her first manuscripts for a contest, winning the science fiction/fantasy category and attracting the notice of an editor. Swendson sold this novel and two others in 1995 to a publisher who insisted that she use a pen name. She chose the name Samantha Carter, in part because she wanted to retain her own first initial but have a last initial from the other half of the alphabet from her own, and in part because she was a fan of The X-Files episode that included the Samantha clones. Her alter ego was named well before 1997 debut of the character on Stargate SG-1.

After selling two more novels, this time to Harlequin Books, Swendson endured an eight-year period where she could not sell any of her other work. Her new job for a major international public relations firm required a great deal of travel and long hours, leaving her little or no time to write. Rather than allow her to resign, Swendson's supervisor asked her to work a three-quarter time schedule and gave her permission to telecommute, which freed her schedule enough that she could begin writing again. Office politics began to arise, however, and Swendson became less and less happy with the job.

In 2004, she sold Enchanted, Inc. to Ballantine Books. Swendson has since written five sequels featuring the heroine Katie Chandler. Book 7, Kiss and Spell, is now available in the major bookstores.

Strike Entertainment is in pre-production of a film adaptation of Enchanted, Inc. In January 2010, Steven Rogers was hired to write the screenplay. Rogers wrote the screenplays for romantic comedies Hope Floats, P.S. I Love You, and Kate & Leopold.

Swendson, who is unpartnered, lives in Irving, Texas.

== Bibliography ==
=== Enchanted series ===
- Enchanted, Inc. (May 2005, Ballantine Books, ISBN 978-0-345-48125-2)
- Once Upon Stilettos (April 2006, Ballantine Books, ISBN 978-0-345-48127-6)
- Damsel Under Stress (May 2007, Ballantine Books, ISBN 978-0-345-49292-0)
- Don't Hex with Texas (April 2008, Ballantine Books, ISBN 978-0-345-49293-7)
- Much Ado About Magic (September 2012, NLA Digital Liaison Platform LLC, ISBN 978-1-620-51052-0)
- No Quest for the Wicked (October 2012, NLA Digital Liaison Platform LLC, ISBN 978-1-620-51056-8)
- Kiss and Spell (May 2013, NLA Digital Liaison Platform LLC, ISBN 978-1-620-51078-0)
- Frogs and Kisses (December 2016, NLA Digital Liaison Platform LLC, ISBN 978-1-620-51256-2)
- Enchanted Ever After (July 2019, Independently published, ISBN 978-1-079-31713-8)

=== Fairy Tales series ===
- A Fairy Tale
- To Catch a Queen
- A Kind of Magic

=== Essays ===
Swendson contributed essays that appear in the following books:

- Flirting with Pride and Prejudice (edited by Jennifer Crusie, September 2005, BenBella Books, ISBN 978-1-932100-72-3)
- Welcome to Wisteria Lane (about the TV series Desperate Housewives; edited by Leah Wilson, May 2006, BenBella Books, ISBN 978-1-932100-79-2)
- So Say We All (about the TV series Battlestar Galactica; edited by Richard Hatch, October 2006, BenBella Books, ISBN 978-1-932100-94-5)
- Everything I Needed to Know About Being a Girl I Learned from Judy Blume (edited by Jennifer O'Connell, June 2007, Pocket Books, ISBN 978-1-4165-3104-3)
- Perfectly Plum (about fictional detective Stephanie Plum; edited by Leah Wilson, June 2007, BenBella Books, ISBN 978-1-933771-04-5)
- Serenity Found: More Unauthorized Essays on Joss Whedon's Firefly Universe (edited by Jane Espenson, October 2007, BenBella Books ISBN 978-1-933771-21-2)

=== Category romance ===
- A Storybook Hero (March 1993, Avalon Contemporary Romance, ISBN 978-0-8034-8985-1)
- Love's Best Friend (December 1993, Avalon Contemporary Romance, ISBN 978-0-8034-9002-4)
- Runaway Hearts (June 1994, Avalon Contemporary Romance, ISBN 978-0-8034-9054-3)
- Dateless in Dallas (as Samantha Carter) (September 1996, Silhouette Yours Truly, ISBN 978-0-373-52030-5)
- The Emergency Stand-By Date (as Samantha Carter) (February 1998, Silhouette Yours Truly, ISBN 978-0-373-52063-3)

=== Young Adult ===
- Rebel Mechanics: All is Fair in Love and Revolution (2015) ISBN 978-0-374-30009-8
- Rebel Magisters (2016)
- Rebels Rising (2017)
