= Michael de Angelo =

American dramatist

- Occupations: Author; screenwriter; poet
- Writing career
- Notable works: Cyr Myrddin, The Coming of Age of Merlin

Michael de Angelo is an American historical fiction author, screenwriter, and poet.

== Career ==
De Angelo's first published novel was Cyr Myrddin, the Coming of Age of Merlin. He has two other published novels, Chronicles of the King, the Coming of the Bear, and Viking, Killing the Young. These works, published by the Gododdin Publishing house, use the literary form of historical fiction to explore current themes.

== Works ==
=== Cyr Myrddin, The Coming of Age of Merlin ===
Cyr Myrddin, The Coming of Age of Merlin is an Arthurian historical novel. It was first published through Gododdin Publishing. A portion of the book was re-printed as the short story, The Tintagel Vision of the Celtic Priesthood.

This work is the story of the early life of Merlin as he searches for his destiny. Set in fifth century, post-Roman, Britain, the work presents a fictionalized portrait of the young Merlin as he comes to fulfill his destiny in King Arthur's court.

=== Chronicles of the King: The Coming of the Bear ===
"Chronicles of the King: The Coming of the Bear" is an Arthurian historical long form prose poem written in first person stream-of-consciousness within the mind of King Arthur. It was published in 2009 by Gododdin Publishing.

==== Synopsis ====
This work is the story of King Arthur waiting by a fire as he recounts his own history and the history of the island of Great Britain, and the forces that have led him to the present moment. He leads his cavalry over a treacherous mountain pass in order to surprise a much larger force of Saxon infantry on the plain below, forging his own identity further with each swing of his sword.

==== Theme ====
This work explores the intertwining of the will to violence with the forging of a historical identity.

=== Viking, Killing the Young ===
Viking, Killing the Young is a historical novel set in tenth century Norway. It was first published by Gododdin Publishing.

==== Synopsis ====
This work is the story of the young Viking Gundar who upon returning home to his family after years of raiding suffers a raid upon his home and children that changes his life forever. While pursuing his journey of vengeance, Gundar comes in contact with early Christianity in Norway. This is the story of a spiritual journey through violence, vengeance, love, and redemption.

==== Theme ====
This work explores the advent of Christianity into tenth century Viking culture, examining the message of love and redemption in the context of personal tragedy and the will to vengeance.
