= Age of Wonders: Planetfall =

2019 video game

- Developer: Triumph Studios
- Publisher: Paradox Interactive
- Directors: Lennart Sas, Arno van Wingerden
- Producers: Djurre van Dijk, Frederick Milders
- Designers: Danika Arents, Luis Ferreira, Thomas Schuiten, Bas Staffhorst
- Programmer: Tom Bird
- Writer: Jakob Matthes
- Composer: Michiel van den Bos
- Series: Age of Wonders
- Engine: Creator Engine
- Platforms: PlayStation 4, Windows, Xbox One, macOS
- Release: PlayStation 4, Windows, Xbox One; August 6, 2019 macOS; May 26, 2020
- Genres: 4X, turn-based strategy
- Modes: Single-player, multiplayer

Age of Wonders: Planetfall is a 4X turn-based strategy video game developed by Triumph Studios and published by Paradox Interactive. It is the fifth Age of Wonders game and a spin-off due to the sci-fi setting. It was released for Windows, PlayStation 4 and Xbox One in August 2019 and for macOS in May 2020.

== Premise ==
In the distant future. An unknown cataclysm brought the demise of Star Union, an intergalactic human government. Factions rise and battle for dominance as they carve a new future for humanity, and in the process, unwind the cosmic mystery behind the Union's collapse.

== Gameplay ==
The game featured six different factions at launch, with each having different units and gameplay. For instance, the Amazons are an all-female human faction who use dinosaurs as their mounts and weapons, while the Kir’ko are a group of insectoid species which use melee as their main form of offense. The player assumes control of a commander of one of the factions: a customizable leader figure that can explore the planet, engage in diplomacy, endorse covert operations and spying activities, and declare war. The world's map, which is procedurally generated, is broken down into different sectors. Each sector has two different biomes, which can be exploited for production, food, research, and energy. These exploitations can be further boosted by placing landmark structures in a biome. As the players expand, they will control more cities, each of which can be managed separately. Players can scavenge resources in the map for research and invade hostile camps to seize their technology. In the map, players will encounter neutral factions, who can ally with the players' faction and provide additional combat support. The game introduces the "Doomsday tech", which is a skill tree that will ultimately unlock a weapon of mass destruction. The player can also build navy fleets and airforce to further strengthen their faction's military power.

The turn-based ground combat uses a top-down perspective. The player controls different military units and troops by guiding their position in the warzone and instructing them to take cover, open fire, and use tactics such as overwatch. In a turn, each unit can perform three actions. Players can "stagger" an enemy, which disrupts their special attacks and causes them to lose one action point. A new mechanic named grazing was introduced, in which missed shots will land half damage. Military units can be upgraded with different mods and equipment in order to increase their combat efficiency.

== Development ==
The game was developed by Triumph Studios and published by Paradox Interactive, which acquired the studio in 2017. Development of the game begun in mid 2015. It abandoned the fantasy setting of the Age of Wonders series for a sci-fi setting as the team wanted to experiment with new themes and ideas, having worked only on fantasy games since the first Age of Wonders title. Planetfall is a spin-off of the fantasy-themed, main series. Thus the lore and timeline are separate as well. The expanded diplomacy was inspired by Paradox Development Studios' grand strategy games. Warzones were made more complex as they were more vertical and destructible when compared with Age of Wonders III. The team evaluated the feedback of Age of Wonders III and made various improvements, such as increasing the economic system's complexity by offering players more gameplay choices. The team also tried to make each faction more unique by giving them different gameplay advantages and features. Triumph Studios' initially found creating the game's setting a challenge until they settled on the concept of Star Union, which tied all factions and units together as it was their shared origin. Star Wars, Fallout, and Hyperion were the team's inspirations when creating the game's lore.

The game was announced in May 2018 by Paradox Interactive. The game was released for Windows, PlayStation 4 and Xbox One on August 6, 2019. Players could also purchase the Deluxe Edition, which includes several new cosmetics, and the Premium Edition, which includes access to three post-release expansion packs, the first of which, Revelations, was released on November 19, 2019. The other DLC expansion packs were Invasions, released on May 26, 2020, coinciding with the game's availability on macOS, and Star Kings, which was released on November 10, 2020.

== Reception ==
The game received generally positive reviews according to review aggregator website Metacritic. Fellow review aggregator OpenCritic assessed that the game received strong approval, being recommended by 87% of critics.

=== Accolades ===
The game was nominated for "PC Game of the Year" at the 2019 Golden Joystick Awards, for "Best Strategy Game" at The Game Awards 2019, and for "Game, Strategy" at the NAVGTR Awards.

== See also ==
- List of turn-based strategy video games
- List of Paradox Interactive games
