= Triumph Studios =

Dutch video game developer

- Type: Subsidiary
- Industry: Video games
- Founded: 1997
- Headquarters: Delft, Netherlands
- Key people: Lennart Sas, Arno van Wingerden
- Products: Age of Wonders series Overlord series
- Number of employees: 25 – 40
- Parent: Paradox Interactive (2017–present)
- Website: triumph.net

Triumph Studios is a Dutch video game developer based in Delft, founded in 1997. The studio is known for Age of Wonders, a strategy game series released starting in 1999, and the action-adventure games Overlord and sequel Overlord II, released in 2007 and 2009. It has developed several games for the Microsoft Windows, Xbox 360 and PlayStation 3.

In June 2017 Paradox Interactive announced that it had acquired Triumph Studios. The deal was worth around $4.5 million dollars (4 million euros). Triumph became a fourth major Paradox studio, while also becoming its first outside of Sweden.

== Games ==
| Year | Game | Publisher | Genre | Platform(s) | | | | | |
| Year | Game | Publisher | Genre | Win | OS X | Linux | X360 / PS3 | Xbox One / PS4 | XSX/S / PS5 |
|---|---|---|---|---|---|---|---|---|---|
| 1999 | Age of Wonders (co-developed by Epic Games) | Gathering of Developers | Turn-based strategy | Yes | No | No | No | No | No |
| 2002 | Age of Wonders II: The Wizard's Throne | Take-Two Interactive | Turn-based strategy | Yes | No | No | No | No | No |
| 2003 | Age of Wonders: Shadow Magic | Gathering of Developers | Turn-based strategy | Yes | No | No | No | No | No |
| 2007 | Overlord | Codemasters | Action role-playing | Yes | Yes | Yes | Yes | No | No |
| 2008 | Overlord: Raising Hell | Codemasters | Action role-playing | Yes | Yes | Yes | Yes | No | No |
| 2009 | Overlord II | Codemasters | Action role-playing | Yes | Yes | Yes | Yes | No | No |
| 2014 | Age of Wonders III | Triumph Studios | Turn-based strategy | Yes | Yes | Yes | No | No | No |
| 2019 | Age of Wonders: Planetfall | Paradox Interactive | Turn-based strategy | Yes | Yes | No | No | Yes | No |
| 2023 | Age of Wonders 4 | Paradox Interactive | Turn-based strategy | Yes | No | No | No | No | Yes |
