= Age of Wonders II: The Wizard's Throne =

2002 video game

- Developer: Triumph Studios
- Publishers: WW: Gathering of Developers; JP: CAPCOM
- Producer: Chris Lacey
- Designer: Lennart Sas
- Programmer: Arno van Wingerden
- Artists: Mao-lin Liao; Lennart Sas; Martijn Holtkamp
- Writers: Raymond Bingham; Josh Farley
- Composer: Mason B. Fisher
- Series: Age of Wonders
- Platform: Microsoft Windows
- Release: NA: June 12, 2002; EU: June 28, 2002
- Genre: Turn-based strategy
- Modes: Single-player, multiplayer

Age of Wonders II: The Wizard's Throne is a turn-based strategy video game in a fantasy setting. The sequel to Age of Wonders, it was developed by Dutch video game developer Triumph Studios. It was followed by a stand-alone expansion pack, Age of Wonders: Shadow Magic, which introduced random map generation to the series.

== Gameplay ==
A war party preparing to attack a city defended by Nimue.

Players in Age of Wonders II take the role of an immortal spell-casting Wizard. In contrast to Age of Wonders, it cannot be upgraded, but can revive after being killed if they have a Wizard Tower. Hero levels are simpler than other iterations of the series, offering one of three skills per level, depending on the Hero's class, with smaller, faster tactical battles than in Age of Wonders.

In Age of Wonders, magic was used via the spell casting abilities of leaders and heroes, and global spells can be cast some distance away from the hero, with combat spells restricted to battles where a hero with spell casting is present. Magic Age of Wonders II uses a "domain" system with only a small range around heroes, but projected farther by Wizard Towers and relays when a Wizard is present in a tower.

Global spells can only be cast by the Wizard, via a spell book located in the main user interface, within the domain of the casting or allied wizard. Spells in combat can be cast either by Heroes in the battle, or the Wizard if it is within their domain (which includes heroes if the wizard in a tower).

== Development ==
The game was announced in January 2001.

AoW II kept the same 2D artistic style as the original, but uses a then newly developed Direct3D enhanced engine with 32 Bit color, 1280x1024 max resolution and a 3D special effects system.

AoW II was developed using the Delphi programming language (Delphi 5).

== Reception ==
Reception

Review scores
Publication	Score
Computer Gaming World	4.5 out of 5
Game Informer	8.5 out of 10
PC Gamer (US)	90%
PC Zone	82/100

GameSpot named Age of Wonders II a runner-up for its June 2002 "PC Game of the Month" award. It was a nominee for PC Gamer US's "2002 Best Turn-Based Strategy Game" award, which ultimately went to Combat Mission: Barbarossa to Berlin. It was also a finalist for The Electric Playground's 2002 "Best Strategy Game for PC" prize, but lost to Warcraft III: Reign of Chaos. It was a runner-up for GameSpot's annual "Most Improved Sequel on PC" and "Best Game No One Played on PC" awards.
