= Age of Wonders: Shadow Magic =

2003 video game

- Developer: Triumph Studios
- Publisher: Gathering
- Director: Lennart Sas
- Producer: Chris Lacey
- Designer: Lennart Sas
- Programmer: Arno van Wingerden
- Writers: Raymond Bingham; Josh Farley
- Composer: Mason B. Fisher
- Series: Age of Wonders
- Platform: Microsoft Windows
- Release: NA: July 24, 2003; EU: August 29, 2003
- Genre: Turn-based strategy
- Modes: Single-player, multiplayer

Age of Wonders: Shadow Magic is a turn-based strategy video game in a fantasy setting. Shadow Magic is the third incarnation of the Age of Wonders series, and is a stand-alone expansion to Age of Wonders II: The Wizard's Throne. All three games were developed by Triumph Studios. The series is a spiritual successor to Master of Magic, featuring strategic overworld and tactical combat layers.

Much requested by fans, Shadow Magic introduced random map generation to the series, retaining a more active multiplayer community versus it's Wizards Throne predecessor. While the graphical engine is the same as that of The Wizard's Throne, every race received new buildings and at least one new recruitable unit, three new races, and new maps.

== Core game elements ==
Age of Wonders: Shadow Magic overworld screenshot, showing a Wizard to the left of a city with a Wizard's Tower

The key element of the AOW2 : Wizard's Throne and Shadow Magic are the player's leader, the Wizards. In contrast to other iterations of the series, they do not gain experience and are weaker in direct combat than Heroes, who can be hired.

As with preceding games, players can research spells from chosen elemental spheres of magic. Spells are cast at vastly longer range when residing in AOW2's defining Wizard Towers, returning less prominently in Age of Wonders 4. There are fifteen races in the game, of varying good and evil alignment.

The overworld contains basic Civilization-style cities, with unit and building production, along with gold and mana strategic resources and locales like dungeons. Game scenarios offer three different layers, the Surface, Underground and Shadow World, added in Shadow Magic. The campaign focuses in part on its titular antagonist, the Shadow Demons. The Shadow World returns in AOW 4: Eldritch Realms as the more hostile, dungeon-focused Umbral Abyss.

After the end of the official support with patch 1.3, the game was unofficially developed by the fan-community via a community patch. The franchise was re-released on Stardock's Impulse digital distribution service in September 2010, soon after via GOG.com and GamersGate, and finally through Steam service.

== Reception ==
Reception

Review scores
Publication	Score
Computer Gaming World	4.5/5
PC Gamer (US)	92%
X-Play	4/5
PC Format	84%
Computer Games Magazine	4/5

The editors of Computer Gaming World presented Shadow Magic with their 2003 "Strategy Game of the Year" award. They wrote: "Of all the strategy games we played this year, Age of Wonders: Shadow Magic is the only one with the 'just one more turn' addictiveness that distinguishes the best of the best". It was a nominee for PC Gamer US's 2003 "Best Turn-Based Strategy Game" award, although it lost to Combat Mission: Afrika Korps.

== Development ==
AoE: Shadow Magic was developed using the Delphi programming language (Delphi 7).
