= Parliamentary Private Secretary to the Prime Minister =

Role in the British government

- Royal Arms as used by His Majesty's Government
- Prime Minister's Office
- Appointer: Prime Minister
- Formation: 1906
- First holder: Hubert Carr-Gomm
- Website: 10 Downing Street

The parliamentary private secretary to the prime minister is a parliamentary private secretary serving the prime minister of the United Kingdom. The holder of the office is widely viewed as the prime minister's "eyes and ears" on the backbenches, serving as a liaison to the prime minister's parliamentary party. The parliamentary private secretary is also responsible for meeting with members of Parliament when the prime minister is unavailable, and accompanying the prime minister to, and assisting them with preparations for Prime Minister's Questions. They usually sit directly behind the prime minister during question time.

== Role ==
The parliamentary private secretary can become a highly powerful and significant role; Bonar Law's parliamentary private secretary, J.C.C. Davidson, acted in effect as his chief of staff. Margaret Thatcher's downfall from the Conservative Party leadership in 1990 is attributed by many to the actions of her parliamentary private secretary, Peter Morrison, in failing to accurately count votes amongst Conservative backbenchers. Some parliamentary private secretaries to the prime minister go on to hold higher office; Alec Douglas-Home served as parliamentary private secretary under Neville Chamberlain and later went on to serve as prime minister in his own right.

There can be multiple parliamentary private secretaries to the prime minister at a given time. Many prime ministers have used this tactic during their premierships; former prime minister David Cameron only employed one parliamentary private secretary at a time during his tenure in office, but he appointed Sir John Hayes as a minister without portfolio with responsibility for the Parliamentary Conservative Party, a job typically reserved for the parliamentary private secretary.

== Parliamentary private secretaries to the prime minister (1906–present) ==
The following table lists parliamentary private secretaries to successive prime ministers from 1906.

| Name | Portrait | Term of office | | Political party | Prime Minister |
|---|---|---|---|---|---|
| Hubert Carr-Gomm | | 1906 | 1908 | Liberal | Sir Henry Campbell-Bannerman |
| Geoffrey Howard | | 1908 | 1909 | Liberal | H. H. Asquith (I) |
| Charles Henry Lyell | | 1908 | 1915 | Liberal | H. H. Asquith (I) |
| Charles Henry Lyell | | 1908 | 1915 | Liberal | H. H. Asquith (Coalition) |
| Sir John Barran, 2nd Baronet | | 1916 | 1918 | Liberal | David Lloyd George (Coalition) |
| David Davies | | 1916 | 1918 | Liberal | David Lloyd George (Coalition) |
| William Sutherland | | 1916 | 1918 | Liberal | David Lloyd George (Coalition) |
| Waldorf Astor | | 1918 | | Conservative | David Lloyd George (Coalition) |
| William Sutherland | | 1919 | 1920 | Liberal | David Lloyd George (Coalition) |
| Sir Philip Sassoon, Bt | | 1920 | 1922 | Conservative | David Lloyd George (Coalition) |
| J.C.C. Davidson | | 1922 | 1923 | Conservative | Bonar Law |
| Sidney Herbert | | 1923 | 1924 | Conservative | Stanley Baldwin |
| Lauchlin MacNeill Weir | | 1924 | | Labour | Ramsay MacDonald |
| Sidney Herbert | | 1924 | 1927 | Conservative | Stanley Baldwin |
| Charles Rhys | | 1927 | 1929 | Conservative | Stanley Baldwin |
| Lauchlin MacNeill Weir | | 1929 | 1931 | Labour | Ramsay MacDonald (II) |
| Robert Morrison | | 1929 | 1931 | Labour | Ramsay MacDonald (II) |
| Frank Markham | | 1931 | 1932 | National Labour | Ramsay MacDonald (First National ministry · Second National ministry) |
| Ralph Glyn | | 1931 | 1935 | Conservative | Ramsay MacDonald (First National ministry · Second National ministry) |
| John Vigers Worthington | | 1931 | 1935 | National Labour | Ramsay MacDonald (First National ministry · Second National ministry) |
| Geoffrey Lloyd | | 1935 | | Conservative | Stanley Baldwin |
| Thomas Dugdale | | 1935 | 1937 | Conservative | Stanley Baldwin |
| Alec Douglas-Home | | 1937 | 1940 | Conservative | Neville Chamberlain |
| Brendan Bracken | | 1940 | 1941 | Conservative | Winston Churchill |
| George Harvie-Watt | | 1941 | 1945 | Conservative | Winston Churchill |
| Geoffrey de Freitas | | 1945 | 1946 | Labour | Clement Attlee |
| Arthur Moyle | | 1946 | 1951 | Labour | Clement Attlee |
| Christopher Soames | | 1952 | 1955 | Conservative | Winston Churchill |
| Robert Carr | | April 1955 | December 1955 | Conservative | Anthony Eden |
| Robert Allan | | 1955 | 1956 | Conservative | Anthony Eden |
| Anthony Barber | | 1957 | 1959 | Conservative | Harold Macmillan |
| Knox Cunningham | | 1959 | 1963 | Ulster Unionist | Harold Macmillan |
| Francis Pearson | | November 1963 | October 1964 | Conservative | Alec Douglas-Home |
| Ernest Fernyhough | | 1964 | 1967 | Labour | Harold Wilson |
| Peter Shore | | 1965 | 1966 | Labour | Harold Wilson |
| Harold Davies | | January 1967 | June 1970 | Labour | Harold Wilson |
| Eric Varley | | November 1968 | October 1969 | Labour | Harold Wilson |
| Timothy Kitson | | 1970 | 1974 | Conservative | Edward Heath |
| Bill Hamling | | 1974 | 1975 | Labour | Harold Wilson |
| Kenneth Marks | | April 1975 | December 1975 | Labour | Harold Wilson |
| John Tomlinson | | 1975 | 1976 | Labour Co-op | Harold Wilson |
| Jack Cunningham | | 1976 | 1977 | Labour | James Callaghan |
| Roger Stott | | 1977 | 1979 | Labour | James Callaghan |
| Ian Gow | | 1979 | 1983 | Conservative | Margaret Thatcher |
| Michael Alison | | 1983 | 1987 | Conservative | Margaret Thatcher |
| Archie Hamilton | | 1987 | 1988 | Conservative | Margaret Thatcher |
| Mark Lennox-Boyd | | 1988 | 1990 | Conservative | Margaret Thatcher |
| Peter Morrison | | 1990 | 1990 | Conservative | Margaret Thatcher |
| Graham Bright | | 1990 | 1994 | Conservative | John Major |
| John Devereux Ward | | 1994 | 2 May 1997 | Conservative | John Major |
| Ann Coffey | | 2 May 1997 | 1998 | Labour | Tony Blair |
| Bruce Grocott | | 2 May 1997 | 8 June 2001 | Labour | Tony Blair |
| David Hanson | | 8 June 2001 | 6 May 2005 | Labour | Tony Blair |
| Keith Hill | | 6 May 2005 | 27 June 2007 | Labour | Tony Blair |
| Ian Austin | | 27 June 2007 | 4 October 2008 | Labour | Gordon Brown |
| Angela Smith | | 27 June 2007 | 28 June 2009 | Labour | Gordon Brown |
| Jon Trickett | | 4 October 2008 | 12 May 2010 | Labour | Gordon Brown |
| Anne Snelgrove | | 8 June 2009 | 12 May 2010 | Labour | Gordon Brown |
| Desmond Swayne | | 12 May 2010 | 4 September 2012 | Conservative | David Cameron (Coalition) |
| Sam Gyimah | | 4 September 2012 | 7 October 2013 | Conservative | David Cameron (Coalition) |
| Gavin Williamson | | 7 October 2013 | 13 July 2016 | Conservative | David Cameron (Coalition) |
| Gavin Williamson | | 7 October 2013 | 13 July 2016 | Conservative | David Cameron (II) |
| George Hollingbery | | 17 July 2016 | 21 June 2018 | Conservative | Theresa May |
| Seema Kennedy | | 27 June 2017 | 4 April 2019 | Conservative | Theresa May |
| Andrew Bowie | | 29 December 2018 | 24 July 2019 | Conservative | Theresa May |
| Alex Burghart | | 25 July 2019 | 17 September 2021 | Conservative | Boris Johnson |
| James Heappey | | 4 August 2019 | 16 December 2019 | Conservative | Boris Johnson |
| Trudy Harrison | | 16 December 2019 | 17 September 2021 | Conservative | Boris Johnson |
| Andrew Griffith | | 17 September 2021 | 3 February 2022 | Conservative | Boris Johnson |
| Sarah Dines | | 17 September 2021 | 8 July 2022 | Conservative | Boris Johnson |
| Joy Morrissey | | 8 February 2022 | 8 July 2022 | Conservative | Boris Johnson |
| Lia Nici | | 8 February 2022 | 8 July 2022 | Conservative | Boris Johnson |
| James Duddridge | | 8 February 2022 | 8 July 2022 | Conservative | Boris Johnson |
| Alexander Stafford | | 8 July 2022 | 6 September 2022 | Conservative | Boris Johnson |
| Suzanne Webb | | 6 September 2022 | 25 October 2022 | Conservative | Liz Truss |
| Craig Williams | | 25 October 2022 | 25 June 2024 | Conservative | Rishi Sunak |
| Chris Ward | | 19 July 2024 | 6 September 2025 | Labour | Keir Starmer |
| Liz Twist | | 17 July 2024 | 11 September 2025 | Labour | Keir Starmer |
| Abena Oppong-Asare | | 11 September 2025 | 20 July 2026 | Labour | Keir Starmer |
| Catherine Fookes | | 11 September 2025 | 20 July 2026 | Labour | Keir Starmer |
| Jon Pearce | | 11 September 2025 | 20 July 2026 | Labour | Keir Starmer |
| Sir Nic Dakin | | 27 July 2026 | Incumbent | Labour | Andy Burnham |
| David Baines | | 27 July 2026 | Incumbent | Labour | Andy Burnham |
| Jo Platt | | 27 July 2026 | Incumbent | Labour Co-op | Andy Burnham |

== In popular culture ==
The final instalment of Michael Dobbs's and the BBC's House of Cards trilogy, The Final Cut, includes a character, Claire Carlsen, who serves as Prime Minister Francis Urquhart's parliamentary private secretary, ultimately betraying him by attempting to leak documents about his service in the British Army.

== See also ==
- Downing Street Chief of Staff
- Parliamentary Private Secretary
- Parliamentary Private Secretary to the Cabinet Office
- Prime Minister's Office
- Principal Private Secretary to the Prime Minister of the United Kingdom
