= Frank Underwood (House of Cards) =

Fictional 46th president of the United States in House of Cards

- House of Cards character
- Kevin Spacey as Frank Underwood
- First appearance: "Chapter 1"; February 1, 2013
- Last appearance: "Chapter 65" (official); May 30, 2017 "Chapter 66" (stand-in); November 2, 2018
- Created by: Beau Willimon
- Portrayed by: Kevin Spacey; Uncredited stand-in (season 6)

In-universe information
- Full name: Francis Joseph Underwood
- Title: President of the United States
- Occupation: Member of the South Carolina Senate (1985–1991); Member of the U.S. House of Representatives from South Carolina's 5th congressional district (1991–2013); Majority Whip of the United States House of Representatives (2005–2013); Vice President of the United States (2013–2014); President of the United States (2014–2017); Second Gentleman of the United States (2017); Special Advisor to the President (2017); First Gentleman of the United States (2017)
- Family: Calvin T. Underwood (father); Catherine Underwood (mother)
- Spouse: Claire Underwood (m. 1987)
- Nationality: American
- Party: Democratic
- Hometown: Gaffney, South Carolina
- Alma mater: The Sentinel (BA, 1981); Harvard Law School (JD, 1984)
- Based on: Francis Urquhart

Francis Joseph Underwood is a fictional character and the villain protagonist of the American adaptation of House of Cards, portrayed by Kevin Spacey. He is depicted as a ruthless politician who rises from United States House of Representatives majority whip to president of the United States through treachery, deception and murder. He is based on Francis Urquhart, the protagonist of the British novel and television series House of Cards, from which the American Netflix series is drawn. He is married to Claire Underwood (Robin Wright) and also had a sexual relationship with Zoe Barnes (Kate Mara) in season 1. He made his first appearance in the series' pilot episode, "Chapter 1".

Underwood is from Gaffney, South Carolina. He graduated from The Sentinel (a fictionalized version of The Citadel, The Military College of South Carolina) in 1980 and, subsequently, Harvard Law School in 1984. Some of Underwood's dialogue throughout the series is presented in a direct address to the audience, a narrative technique that breaks the fourth wall. The character speaks with a Southern accent. During season 1, he is the Democratic majority whip in the United States House of Representatives. In season 2, he is the newly appointed vice president of the United States, before becoming president of the United States in the season finale.

Underwood has been described as conniving, Machiavellian, sociopathic, and a symbol of political corruption. Throughout the series, he manipulates and destroys several people, including those he calls friends, for his own ends. Among other crimes, he personally commits murder twice, signs off on another murder committed by a subordinate, orders the deaths of two former employees, critically injures a member of his cabinet to prevent her testifying against him, attempts to murder his wife, and indirectly allows the murder of a civilian for political ends.

While Spacey received positive reviews for his portrayal of Frank Underwood, the character itself has been criticized for its repetitive nature, as well as one-dimensionality. Spacey was one of the first three actors playing leading roles in web-television series to be nominated for Primetime Emmy Awards at the 65th Primetime Emmy Awards. Spacey has also been nominated for two Golden Globe Awards, winning one, and five Screen Actors Guild Awards, including two cast nominations and including two wins, for his performances.

On November 3, 2017, following sexual assault claims made against Spacey, Netflix cut ties with the actor, putting the character's fate in question. In a teaser trailer for the sixth season of House of Cards, it is shown that Underwood died in 2017 and is now buried next to his father in South Carolina. The series finale reveals that his right-hand man, Doug Stamper (Michael Kelly), poisoned him in order to stop him from killing Claire.

== Background and description ==
=== Early life ===
Francis J. Underwood was born on November 5, 1959, to Catherine and Calvin T. Underwood in Gaffney, South Carolina. He is an only child. He was raised in impoverished circumstances, with the threat of bank foreclosure on the farm they lived on. He entered The Sentinel, a military school in Charleston, South Carolina, loosely based on The Citadel, The Military College of South Carolina, in the fall of 1976. He graduated in 1980 and, despite having made poor grades, gained admittance into Harvard Law School. He received his J.D. degree from there in 1984. While at the Sentinel, he had a homosexual relationship with his roommate, Tim Corbet (David Andrews), which lasted until his first year of law school. Underwood was raised Christian and publicly pays lip service to religious faith, but privately holds God in complete contempt and considers Christianity a source of weakness.

=== Family ===
Underwood's great-great-great-grandfather, Corporal Augustus Elijah Underwood, was a Confederate soldier who served in the 12th South Carolina Infantry Regiment of Samuel McGowan's Brigade at the Battle of Spotsylvania. He served at the Bloody Angle on May 12, 1864, during the Civil War and was killed by a bludgeon to the back of the head from his own regiment during the middle of the night. Underwood is fascinated by his ancestry, even though he dismisses the Confederacy as "weak" and their cause of preserving slavery "asinine". When Underwood falls into a coma following an assassination attempt, Augustus appears in several of his hallucinations. His great-great grandfather was two when Augustus was killed.

His father, Calvin T. Underwood, was a peach farmer in his home town of Gaffney who died at the age of 43 of a heart attack. The Underwoods lived in poverty, and nearly lost the farm when Frank was a child; to get a bank loan and avoid foreclosure, his father attended a meeting of the Ku Klux Klan, of which the bank manager was a member. Underwood speaks fondly of his father in public, but this is a political ploy; in his asides to the audience, Underwood describes his father as a weak man who accomplished nothing with his life. He even urinates on his father's grave in season 3. Despite disliking his father, however, Underwood was influenced by him. Calvin was an abusive alcoholic and caused his wife and son years of misery. Underwood has said that when he was 13, he walked in on his father putting a shotgun in his mouth. Calvin asked him to pull the trigger, which he refused to do. He has stated that his biggest regret is not killing his father when he had the chance.

=== Political career ===
==== South Carolina Legislature ====
Underwood was elected at the age of 25 to the South Carolina State Senate as one of the youngest members in the state's legislative history after graduating from Harvard in 1984. He was re-elected to the state senate at 29 in 1988 for his second, and last, term as a State Senator.

==== House of Representatives ====
Underwood was elected to the U.S. House of Representatives in 1990 as a Democratic representative for the 5th Congressional District of South Carolina, being sworn in on January 3, 1991. He won another 11 consecutive elections, winning his final term in 2012. He was elected Whip for the Democratic Party in 2005, serving as House Majority Whip between 2005 and 2013.

In 2005, Underwood was elected Majority Whip of the House Democratic caucus, a role he held until 2013. As Majority Whip, he was responsible for ensuring party discipline, counting votes, and coordinating legislative priorities between leadership and rank-and-file members. His tenure in this role was marked by a high degree of internal influence, as he played a central part in negotiating support for major legislative initiatives and managing intra-party divisions. He became known for his effectiveness in securing votes on contentious measures and for maintaining a tightly organized whip operation. This position significantly increased his visibility and influence within Congress, making him one of the most powerful figures in the chamber despite not holding a formal leadership title such as Speaker.

==== Vice Presidency ====
Following the 2012 presidential election, Underwood was initially considered for the position of Secretary of State in the administration of Garrett Walker, but was ultimately not selected. He continued serving in Congress until 2013, when Vice President Jim Matthews resigned to pursue the governorship of Pennsylvania. Underwood was nominated by President Walker to fill the vacancy and was subsequently confirmed by Congress. As Vice President, he occupied a constitutionally limited role but remained an active participant in executive branch strategy and legislative coordination. His prior experience in Congress allowed him to serve as a liaison between the White House and House leadership, maintaining influence over legislative affairs.

==== Presidency ====
Underwood assumed the presidency in 2014 following the resignation of President Walker amid a widening political and legal crisis. His accession to office occurred without a direct presidential election, making the question of democratic legitimacy a recurring issue during his tenure. As President of the United States, he advanced a domestic policy agenda centered on employment and economic restructuring, most notably through the proposed “America Works” program. His administration also engaged in foreign policy initiatives and crisis management, although his governing style was often characterized by a highly centralized decision-making process within the executive branch.

===== 2016 election =====
In 2016, Underwood sought to secure a full term in office through the electoral process, running as the Democratic nominee with Vice President Claire Underwood as his running mate. He faced Republican nominee Will Conway in a closely contested and highly polarized campaign. The election was marked by disputes over voting procedures, allegations of irregularities, and legal challenges in several key states. Despite the contentious environment, Underwood ultimately secured victory, thereby obtaining an elected mandate to continue in office.

===== Later presidency and resignation =====
During his elected term, Underwood's administration encountered increasing scrutiny from Congress, federal authorities, and the press regarding allegations of misconduct, abuse of power, and obstruction. Investigations intensified over time, contributing to a decline in political support both within his party and among the public. As the prospect of impeachment proceedings became more likely, pressure mounted on the administration. In 2017, Underwood resigned from the presidency, bringing his tenure to an end. He was succeeded by Vice President Claire Underwood, who assumed office in accordance with constitutional procedures.

=== Personal life ===
==== Personality ====
Underwood is utterly ruthless and Machiavellian, and is willing to commit any crime, including murder, to further his goal of attaining power. Many critics have described him as a sociopath and as "pure evil".

Often, Underwood's thoughts throughout the series are presented in a direct address to the audience, a narrative technique known as breaking the fourth wall. Immediately prior to starring in House of Cards, Spacey had starred in a production of William Shakespeare's Richard III as Richard III of England, a character that serves as a partial basis for both Urquhart and Underwood. His last name is derived from Oscar Underwood, who served as the first Democratic House Minority Whip from about 1900 to 1901. His few vices include smoking cigarettes and playing video games; when the Secret Service cuts off his online gaming service after he becomes vice president, he takes up creating model figurines.

Spacey viewed portraying Underwood for a second season as a continuing learning process. "There is so much I don't know about Francis, so much that I'm learning... I've always thought that the profession closest to that of an actor is being a detective... We are given clues by writers... Then you lay them all out and try to make them come alive as a character who's complex and surprising, maybe even to yourself."

According to Time television critic James Poniewozik, by the end of the first episode, it becomes clear that Underwood both literally and figuratively uses meat as his metaphor of choice. He may begin a day with a celebratory rack of ribs, because "I'm feelin' hungry today!", and he depicts his life with meat metaphors. For example, he describes the White House Chief of Staff with grudging admiration: "She's as tough as a two-dollar steak" and plans to destroy an enemy the way "you devour a whale. One bite at a time". He also endures a tedious weekly meeting with House leaders, as he tells the audience, by "[imagining] their lightly salted faces frying in a skillet."

Tim Goodman of The Hollywood Reporter notes that, in Season 2, with Underwood's new position as vice president, "He's got more power now and that means he instills more fear in his enemies". At one point during the season, he states "The road to power is paved with hypocrisy and casualties. I need to prove what the vice president is capable of." Underwood and Claire "continue their ruthless rise to power as threats mount on all fronts."

==== Sexuality ====
Underwood's sexuality is ambiguous throughout much of the first two seasons; he has sexual liaisons with both men and women, but he is never explicitly identified by any sexual label. Before Season 2, various sources speculated about his homosexuality. It is revealed in "Chapter 8" he had an experience with homosexuality in college. Underwood and Claire are never depicted having sex in season 1. Slate journalist Hanna Rosin noted: if Frank and Claire Underwood were a real-life Washington couple and they were found each to be having an affair, he would be accused of being "secretly gay, turned on by women only when he can use them for a pure power play". Other sources make no definite stance on Underwood's sexuality, but hypothesize that he is not sexually attracted to Claire. In season 2, Underwood is involved in a threesome with Claire and Secret Service agent Edward Meechum (Nathan Darrow), while in season 3, there is a moment of sexual tension between Underwood and his biographer, Tom Yates (Paul Sparks), who later embarks in a physical and romantic emotional relationship with Claire. The same season, however, also features the only scene in the series in which Underwood and Claire have sex exclusively with each other. In season five, he has sex with Eric Rawlings (Malcolm Madera), his male personal trainer.

=== Relationships ===
==== Relationship with Claire Underwood ====
Stelter described Frank and Claire Underwood as a "scheming" couple. Michael Dobbs, the author of the trilogy of novels upon which the British miniseries is based, compares the compelling nature of their relationship favorably to the characters in the original miniseries, and likens them to Macbeth and Lady Macbeth. Underwood says, "I love that woman. I love her more than sharks love blood." While Underwood is Machiavellian, Claire, like Lady Macbeth, encourages her husband to do whatever is necessary to seize power. Hank Stuever of The Washington Post describes her as an ice-queen wife. She encourages his vices while noting her disapproval of his weakness, saying, "My husband doesn't apologize... even to me." Her overt encouragement gives a credibility to their symbiosis. Smith says "The Underwoods have proven themselves almost robotic in their pursuit of power." Upon viewing a four-episode preview of season 2, Goodman says the series "...sells husband and wife power-at-all-costs couple...as a little too oily and reptilian for anyone's good." Willimon notes that "What's extraordinary about Frank and Claire is there is deep love and mutual respect, but the way they achieve this is by operating on a completely different set of rules than the rest of us typically do." Los Angeles Times critic Mary McNamara makes the case that House of Cards is a love story on many levels, but most importantly between Underwood and Claire. It is a story about a man who will commit any crime imaginable while in pursuit of power and a political wife who gives him the encouragement to pursue that power.

Underwood and Claire engage in a threesome with their Secret Service bodyguard Edward Meechum at one point in season 2, but have otherwise largely given up intramarital and extramarital sex in favor of their pursuit of power. International Business Times critic Ellen Killoran notes that this may relate back to Underwood's quotation of Oscar Wilde to Zoe Barnes in Season 1: "A great man once said, 'everything is about sex except sex. Sex is about power.'" Avoiding sex may retain the balance of power in their relationship. His relationship with Claire is the epicenter of season 2.

==== Relationship with Zoe Barnes ====
Underwood develops an intimate relationship with Washington Herald and Slugline reporter Zoe Barnes (Kate Mara), with Claire's knowledge. As the show begins, Barnes is desperate to rise from covering the Fairfax County Council beat to covering what's going on "behind the veil of power in the Capitol hallways." By the end of the first episode, Barnes is among the cadre of Underwood's accomplices. They begin a relationship, with Barnes promising to earn his trust and not "ask any questions" in return for his supplying her with sensitive political information. Toward the end of Season 1, she ends their personal relationship and begins investigating his connection to the apparent suicide of Congressman Peter Russo (Corey Stoll) (Underwood had in fact killed him by flooding his car with carbon monoxide while the Congressman was passed out drunk). Underwood ultimately kills Barnes in the season 2 premiere, by pushing her in front of an oncoming Washington Metro train after she begins to follow clues related to the murder.

==== Relationship with Edward Meechum ====
Underwood is fond of the head of his Secret Service detail, Edward Meechum (Nathan Darrow), and it is hinted several times that they harbor unacknowledged sexual feelings for each other. When Meechum stumbles upon Underwood watching pornography, Underwood and Claire joke about there being sexual chemistry between the two men. Shortly after Underwood becomes vice president, he, Claire and Meechum have a threesome.

Meechum remains Underwood's bodyguard once he becomes the president, and there does not appear to be any continuing sexual relationship. Meechum remains fiercely loyal, however; he warns Underwood's biographer Tom Yates (Paul Sparks) not to write anything that would damage Underwood's reputation. In season 4, Underwood traces Meechum's hand with a marker on one of the walls of the White House when he wants to replace a Confederate painting; Meechum suggests he put up something he likes instead.

When Lucas Goodwin shoots Underwood during a campaign event, Meechum trades fire with the would-be assassin, and both die at the scene. Meechum's death is one of the tragedies Claire mentions in a press briefing for a gun control bill she is sponsoring, and Underwood has him buried in Arlington National Cemetery, a rare privilege for a Secret Service agent. When Underwood recovers and finds that Meechum's hand tracing has been painted over, he expresses grief and regret at the loss to Claire, who says that Meechum was one of the few people who truly understood them.

=== Underwood-Urquhart comparisons ===
Underwood is an Americanized version of the original BBC series lead character Francis Urquhart, a Machiavellian post-Margaret Thatcher Chief Whip of the Conservative Party. Urquhart employs deceit, cunning, murder, and blackmail to influence and pursue the office of Prime Minister of the United Kingdom. According to series producer Beau Willimon, the change in last name stemmed from the "Dickensian" feeling and "more legitimately American" sounding resonance of the name 'Underwood'. Whereas Urquhart is an aristocrat by birth, Underwood is a self-made man, having been born into a poor Southern family with an alcoholic father. Urquhart was one of television's first antiheroes, whereas Underwood follows the more recent rash of antiheroes that includes Tony Soprano of The Sopranos, Walter White of Breaking Bad, and Dexter Morgan of Dexter. However, unlike most other antiheroes, Underwood is not forced into immorality either by circumstance (White), birth (Soprano) or upbringing (Morgan). In his review of Season 2, Slant Magazine's Alan Jones writes that Underwood is evil by choice. Although the character is based on the BBC show's lead character, in interviews during the writing and filming of season 2, creator and showrunner Willimon said that he used Lyndon B. Johnson as a source of themes and issues addressed in House of Cards. Unlike the right wing Urquhart, who leads the Conservative Party, Underwood is a member of the Democratic Party, but cares little for ideology in favor of "ruthless pragmatism" in furthering his own political influence and power.

=== Breaking the fourth wall ===
Spacey summed up Underwood's relationship with the viewer—i.e. whenever he breaks the fourth wall—as being like that of a "best friend" and "the person [he trusts] more than anyone." Because of this, his asides to the viewer serves as an indication of Underwood's true feelings and intentions—typically when he is feigning politeness and courtesy to people whom he despises. In the season 2 premiere, after having gone the whole episode without doing so, Underwood addresses the viewer directly, saying, "Did you think I had forgotten you? Perhaps you hoped I had." In addition, in season 3, after an argument with Claire that ends with her storming out on him, a seething Underwood vents his anger by lashing out at the viewer; looking directly into the camera, he snaps "What're you lookin' at?!"

For the first four seasons, Underwood was the only character to break the fourth wall until the very end of the fourth season, during which Claire—though silent—addresses the camera directly with him. In the fifth season, Claire also addresses the camera directly, on one occasion explaining that she had always known the viewer was there, but didn't know if she could trust them. At the end, after usurping the Presidency from Underwood and deciding not to grant him a pardon, she looks into the camera again and states "My turn."

== Fictional character biography ==
=== Season 1 ===
Power is a lot like real estate. It's all about location, location, location. The closer you are to the source, the higher your property value.

— Underwood

At the start of the show, Underwood is a Democratic Majority Whip in the House of Representatives, where he has represented South Carolina's 5th congressional district since 1990.

Underwood is passed over for an appointment as United States Secretary of State even though he had been promised the position after ensuring the election of Colorado Governor Garrett Walker (Michel Gill) as president. Walker's chief of staff, Linda Vasquez (Sakina Jaffrey), gives him this news prior to the January 2013 United States presidential inauguration. With the aid of Claire, and his fiercely loyal Chief of Staff Doug Stamper (Michael Kelly), Underwood uses his position as House Whip to seek retribution. He quickly allies with Washington Herald reporter Zoe Barnes (Kate Mara), whom he uses to undermine his rivals via the press. The viciousness of Underwood's manipulations escalates over the course of the season. He befriends Pennsylvania Rep. Peter Russo (Corey Stoll), encouraging him to quit drinking and run for Governor of Pennsylvania; then his underlings create enough pressure in the race to push Russo into publicly falling off the wagon and ruining his career. Underwood finally murders him (with unexpected remorse) and makes it look like suicide. He persuades Vice President Jim Matthews (Dan Ziskie) to resign so he can run for the office he previously held, Governor of Pennsylvania, the race being wide open following Russo's death. In the season finale, "Chapter 13", Underwood is appointed Vice President to replace Matthews.

=== Season 2 ===
There are two types of vice presidents: doormats and Matadors. Which do you think I intend to be?

— Underwood

Underwood assumes the position of Vice President of the United States. Over the course of the season, he "faces challenges from similarly ambitious businessmen, the Chinese government and Congress itself" as he continues to pursue his political aspirations. His plotline revolves around battles with billionaire Raymond Tusk (Gerald McRaney), involving Chinese money laundering. Over the course of the season his biggest challenges are the institutional power of the Office of the President and Tusk's power as a billionaire industrialist.

He finds new rivals in Tusk, who seeks to maintain his position as Walker's right-hand adviser against Underwood's intrusion, and his former communications director, Remy Danton (Mahershala Ali), who is now a lobbyist working with Tusk.

At the beginning of the season, Underwood is trying to erase all links to Russo's death. Thus, he kills Barnes by shoving her in front of an oncoming Washington Metro train, and frames her colleague and lover Lucas Goodwin (Sebastian Arcelus) for cyberterrorism. Another early task for newly promoted Underwood is finding his own replacement as House Majority Whip. He supports Jacqueline Sharp (Molly Parker), a military veteran and third-term Representative from California, although he refrains from offering public backing.

Toward the end of the season, Underwood orchestrates Walker's downfall. He secretly leaks the details of the money laundering, for which Walker is blamed. While publicly supporting Walker, Underwood works behind the scenes to have him impeached, with Sharp's help. In the season finale, "Chapter 26", Walker resigns, and Underwood succeeds him as President of the United States.

=== Season 3 ===
When they bury me, it won't be in my backyard, and when they come to pay their respects, they'll have to wait in line.

— Underwood

Season 3 begins with Underwood's presidency off to a rocky start: six months into his term, he is unpopular with the public, and Congress is blocking his attempts to move legislation forward. He plans to secure his legacy with an ambitious jobs bill, America Works, but the Democratic Congressional leadership refuses to support it; they also tell him that they will not support him if he seeks the presidential nomination in the next election. He nominates Claire for United States Ambassador to the United Nations, but her nomination is defeated after she makes a gaffe during a Senate nomination hearing.

Underwood announces that he will not run for reelection, and advocates for America Works, which he intends to pay for by stripping entitlement programs. He fails to get the bill through Congress and uses that as a reason to renege on his promise to not run in 2016. Solicitor General Heather Dunbar (Elizabeth Marvel) announces that she will seek the presidential nomination, and actually gives Underwood a battle. Underwood convinces Sharp to get married so she can announce her candidacy, for the sole reason of sapping women's votes from Dunbar, at which point she will withdraw and accept the nomination for VP. After the presidential debate, in which Underwood publicly humiliates Sharp in order to go after Dunbar, Sharp retaliates by backing Dunbar's campaign. Ultimately, however, Underwood wins the Iowa caucuses.

Meanwhile, the Underwoods' marriage is faltering. Underwood gives Claire the ambassador job in a recess appointment, but she is forced to resign in order to solve a diplomatic crisis. Claire begins to question whether she still loves her husband, and they get into an ugly fight in which he tells her that she is nothing without him. Season 3 ends with Claire leaving Underwood as he prepares for the New Hampshire primary.

=== Season 4 ===
That's right, we don't submit to terror. We make the terror.

— Underwood

Underwood trails Dunbar in the polls, eventually losing the New Hampshire primary. Realizing that he needs Claire to win, he persuades her to come back by promising to support her run for a congressional district in Texas. However, he sandbags her prospective candidacy by endorsing a political ally's daughter, in order to keep Claire focused on his campaign. On the day of the South Carolina primary, Claire retaliates by arranging for two compromising photos to be leaked: one of Underwood's father with a Klansman, and one of Underwood posing with a Confederate Civil War re-enactor. Underwood deduces that Claire was behind the leaks, and confronts her. Claire calmly admits what she did, and puts forth a proposition: that she run as his vice president. He angrily rejects the idea.

Lucas Goodwin is released from prison and, seeking revenge for Barnes' death, shoots Underwood at a campaign rally, hitting him in the liver. He also mortally wounds Meechum, who manages to kill him before succumbing to his injuries. Underwood is rushed to the hospital for immediate surgery, and falls into a coma. It is soon discovered that he needs a liver transplant. Stamper manages to bump him to the top of the transplant list, and he survives. Once he recovers, he agrees to let Claire run as his vice president.

Dunbar drops out of the race due to the discovery of a meeting she'd had with Goodwin a few days before the attempt on Underwood's life. Underwood begins planning to maneuver Claire into the VP spot and to use the NSA to illegally obtain voter information and spy on the Republican nominee, Will Conway (Joel Kinnaman). This happens while Underwood and Claire advocate for a controversial gun control bill for the sole purpose of creating an atmosphere divisive enough to weed out potential running mates. During the resulting open convention, Underwood intimidates the front-runner, Secretary of State Catherine Durant (Jayne Atkinson), into surrendering her delegates, and uses the public sympathy from Claire's mother's death to ensure that he and Claire are nominated.

When American extremists loyal to the terrorist group Islamic Caliphate Organization (ICO) kidnap a suburban family, Underwood allows Conway to negotiate with them, making his opponent look like a hero—and then releases NSA data that proves Conway illegally influenced Congress. Soon afterward, however, Underwood is hit with two crises at once: ICO's leader orders his followers to kill one of the hostages, while journalist Tom Hammerschmidt (Boris McGiver) exposes Underwood's crimes in the Washington Herald. Facing disgrace and possible impeachment, Underwood decides to declare war on ICO and allow the public to see the hostage die in order to distract from the scandal and create an atmosphere of widespread fear that he and Claire can exploit in the weeks before the election.

=== Season 5 ===
One nation, Underwood.

— Underwood

In the days before the election, Underwood pushes Congress to formally declare war on ICO, and orders the CIA to kill one of the terrorists and make it look like he had died fleeing capture. Underwood still lags in the polls, however, and on election night it appears he is going to lose to Conway. With help from Stamper and campaign strategist LeAnn Harvey (Neve Campbell), Underwood has NSA contractor Aidan Macallan (Damian Young) stage a cyberattack on several election stations. He also uses the fear of a possible terrorist attack to pressure the governors of Tennessee and Ohio to halt voting. The tactics work; the two states refuse to declare a winner, and the election drags on unresolved for several weeks.

The presidency is finally set to be decided by a contingent election in the House. Neither Underwood nor Conway receive enough votes, however, Claire, having won the vote for vice president in the Senate, becomes acting president until the House votes again. Underwood tries to convince Arizona Congressman Alex Romero (James Martinez) to vote in his favor, but when Underwood refuses to help him with his own agenda, Romero forms a committee to impeach him.

The Underwoods blackmail Conway's influential campaign manager Mark Usher (Campbell Scott) into joining their side by threatening to release recordings of Conway berating a pilot and his running mate Ted Brockhart (Colm Feore) threatening to kill Frank. Once Usher begins working for them, they release the tapes anyway, which costs Conway the election. Underwood is now President-elect, but his past once again comes back to haunt him when Hammerschmidt writes a story linking him to Barnes' death.

When Romero's committee intensifies its investigation, Underwood tries to divert public attention by ordering troops into Syria under the pretense of preventing a terrorist attack. This provokes Durant to testify against him; before she can take the stand, however, Underwood pushes her down a flight of stairs, incapacitating her. When Walker testifies about Underwood's role in the Chinese money laundering, Underwood takes the stand in his own defense and stuns the committee by resigning the presidency. When Claire demands an explanation, Underwood reveals that his resignation is part of a plan to ensure that they control the country for years to come: Claire from the White House, he from the private sector. To tie up loose ends, he has Macallan and Harvey killed, and persuades Stamper to "confess" to murdering Barnes.

For Underwood's plan to work, however, Claire has to pardon him and Stamper, which would damage her credibility with the public. Claire promises him that she will grant the pardons, but makes no mention of them during her first address to the nation as president. Angered, Underwood calls her several times, but each time he gets her voicemail, causing him to worry that she has abandoned him. He breaks the fourth wall and says, "If she doesn't pardon me, I'll kill her."

=== Season 6 ===
I know, you want to know what really happened to him. A man like Francis doesn't just die. That would be... what's the word? Convenient.

— Claire Underwood

While Underwood does not physically appear in the sixth season of House of Cards, he is mentioned several times, and his actions—occurring offscreen—have great significance. A teaser trailer for the sixth season, released in September 2018, portrays Claire visiting Underwood's grave. Another trailer, released weeks later, confirmed that Underwood is in fact dead. The first episode of the sixth season establishes that Underwood has died of an apparent heart attack; however, Claire suspects that he was murdered. The series finale reveals that Underwood had planned to kill Claire as revenge for abandoning him, and that Stamper poisoned him to stop him from being publicly exposed as a murderer, to "protect the legacy from the man".

=== Non-canon ===
Wait a minute, now that I think of it, you never actually saw me die, did you? Conclusions can be so deceiving. Miss me?

— Underwood

On December 24, 2018, the same day that Spacey was charged with indecent assault and battery, he posted an unofficial short film continuation of House of Cards titled Let Me Be Frank to his YouTube channel. In the video, Spacey addressed the audience as Underwood, obliquely referred to the sexual assault allegations, and hinted that his character may not be dead.

On December 24, 2019, Spacey posted a follow-up short film to Let Me Be Frank titled KTWK to his YouTube channel, once again in-character as Frank Underwood. He wishes the world a "Merry Christmas", comments on it having been a "pretty good year", and says, "The next time someone does something you don't like, you can go on the attack. But you can also hold your fire and do the unexpected. You can ... kill them with kindness."

On April 15, 2025, Spacey reprised Frank Underwood in a promo video for Tim Dillon’s new Netflix comedy special “I’m Your Mother”.

== Critical response ==
=== Season 1 ===
The New York Times' David Itzkoff called Underwood a "scheming politician" who does "some of the most evil and underhanded things imaginable". Brian Stelter of The New York Times said Underwood "...is on a quest for power that's just as suspenseful as anything on television." New York Daily News critic Don Kaplan says "...conniving Congressman Frank Underwood, is easily one of the most complex antiheroes on TV—except he's not on TV". David Wiegand of the San Francisco Chronicle describes the character as one who "all but salivates over the chance to use his considerable power to gain more power, especially if it involves pulling the rug out from under some colleagues and the wool over the eyes of others."

Andrew Davies, the producer of the original UK TV series, feels that Underwood lacks the "charm" of the original character, Francis Urquhart.

The Independent praised Spacey's portrayal as a more "menacing" character, "hiding his rage behind Southern charm and old-fashioned courtesy," while The New Republic noted that "When Urquhart addressed the audience, it was partly in the spirit of conspiratorial fun. His asides sparked with wit. He wasn't just ruthlessly striving, he was amusing himself, mocking the ridiculousness of his milieu. There is no impishness about Spacey's Frank Underwood, just numb, machine-like ambition. Even his affection for his wife is a calculation."

Poniewozik praises Underwood's accent, saying "Spacey gives Underwood a silky Southern accent you could pour over crushed ice and sip with a sprig of mint on Derby Day." Nancy deWolf Smith of The Wall Street Journal describes the accent as a "mild but sometimes missing Carolina accent". Time listed Frank Underwood among the 11 most influential fictional characters in 2013.

=== Season 2 ===
According to The Kansas City Star's Sara Smith, "Frank hasn't changed, and neither has his brand of Machiavellian political theater" and "Spacey has lost none of his smarmy magnetism as the cartoon-ish villain". According to Variety's Brian Lowry, "Kevin Spacey's showy performance as an unscrupulous politician" is foremost among the show's strengths, but the show's weakness is the "failure to present its scheming protagonist with equally matched foes". Lowry feels that as conniving as Underwood is, it is unfathomable that "nobody else in a town built on power seems particularly adept at recognizing this or combating him". Goodman says "Spacey is nothing if not constantly magnetic". The delayed use of the fourth wall is perceived as clever. Alison Willmore of Indiewire says that "Unlike Walter White or Tony Soprano, Frank feels at peace with his ruthless pragmatism and what he does in pursuit of power, and reminds us of the fact in his asides to the camera...he may be a ruthless sociopath, but there's something to admire there". However, Willmore noted that Frank became lighter in season 2, noting that the season was "...delivered with more of a wink by Frank than before."

Poniewozik notes that "It also remains a delight to watch Spacey pump the humid breath of life into House of Cards' arid Capitol chill. If only his character weren't so dominant of his surroundings as well. One reason the series' movements can feel so mechanical is that, so far, no one seems nearly in Underwood's league: not the adversaries he battles directly, nor the sad sacks that he gulls without their even knowing it." Chuck Barney of the San Jose Mercury News notes that the preview episodes show that "Frank's "Survivor"-like back-stabbing is beginning to feel a bit repetitive." and that his lack of an adversarial foil has become an issue: "...things always seem to fall neatly into place for him. Even his showdowns with the president (Michel Gill) come off as one-sided..." Verne Gay of Newsday notes that "Frank Underwood has no remorse, no superannuated sense of Washington tradition or decorum, and certainly no second thoughts. He is TV's perfect monster of the moment—a compleat malefactor, with a pleasing honey-toned drawl."

Alessandra Stanley of The New York Times says "By positing a Johnsonesque power broker and master schemer who wields cabalistic influence behind the scenes, House of Cards assigns order and purpose to what, in real life, is too often just an endless, baffling tick-tack-toe stalemate." NPR's Eric Deggans says that Underwood "blends velvety charm and mesmerizing menace like no other character on television".

New York Observer critic Drew Grant notes that although the series aired during the golden age of dramatic antiheroes, Underwood's villainy has become trite: "House of Cards is a good reminder, however, that there is a reason Iago wasn't the center of Othello. Unrelenting, unexplained cruelty can be as pedantic as constant kindness."

Spacey's portrayal was not without detractors: Hitfix reviewer Alan Sepinwall accused him of "hamming it up" and "phoning it in on a not very good show to begin with".

=== Season 3 ===
Reviews for season 3 of House of Cards were mostly positive. However, a few critics found the Underwood character was becoming repetitive: the critical consensus on the review aggregation site Rotten Tomatoes held that, "Season three introduces intriguing new political and personal elements to Frank Underwood's character, even if it feels like more of the same for some." Ed Power of The Daily Telegraph wrote, "Everyone in House of Cards has an agenda—a secret twitching in the attic. The thrill, and the horror, may lie in the degree to which we catch reflections of real life in its dark, cool contours."

Some critics opined that the Underwood character is less interesting once he achieves his goal of becoming president and actually has to govern. "You could take the show seriously just as long as you didn't have to take it seriously, as long as it only took place in the dream world of imaginary fantasy politics," wrote Aaron Bady of The New Republic, who compared Underwood unfavorably with Josiah Bartlet of The West Wing. "But when a cartoon becomes president, it starts to look too fake to be real, but too real to be a cartoon. Frank plays the role of President Bartlett, a cartoon president doing things that would actually, in reality, be kind of great. But Bartlett was too good to be true, and the old Frank was too evil to be true. President Underwood is just too dull to be a fantasy, and so the props take center stage."

Critics continued to praise Spacey's performance, however. Don Kaplan of The New York Daily News wrote, "Underwood's bottomless appetite for dark dealing keeps Spacey so deliciously detestable you can't help but keep rooting for the bad guy to win."

=== Season 4 ===
In season 4, Jacob Solworthy wrote in his review of the first six episodes of season four: "Until now, 'House of Cards' has centred on the character's outward expression of power -- not to mention his hunger for it -- but the writers have shrewdly stripped that back, instead focusing on the character's internal fears in a way not dissimilar from Tony's dream sequences in 'The Sopranos'," he later added, "You'll never root for Frank more than you do by the end of these six episodes."

On the other hand, Daniel Fienberg from The Hollywood Reporter was critical of Spacey's performance, writing: " Spacey's performance, which at least had an appealingly theatrical extravagance when the series began, has grown less enjoyable. Having reached a pinnacle, there's no way to root for Frank's striving anymore, if you ever were, but House of Cards has yet to commit to urging us to root for Frank's downfall."

There was also considerable mention of the evolution of Underwood's relationship with Claire. "[T]heir partnership has morphed into an entirely professional exercise, with a shared lust for power having supplanted more conventional matrimonial bonds," wrote Brian Lowry of Variety. The Atlantic's Spencer Kornhaber remarked, however, that the utter ruthlessness displayed by Underwoods in the season finale may have represented a "jump the shark" moment for the series:

The Underwoods have murdered a politician and a journalist, and some innocents have also been collateral damage to their activities. Now, though, they've set out to maintain their power at the cost of mass casualties. Netflix hasn't said how many seasons are to come, but it's hard to imagine the show being watchable for all that much longer now that this rubicon of despicability has been crossed.

Some compared Underwood's story line in season 4 to the 2016 U.S. presidential election. Brian Moyland of The Guardian wrote:

House of Cards has never felt like the real presidency: Frank Underwood is evil incarnate, bumping off junior Congressmen and pushing journalists in front of trains. But now that, in real life, we're in the throes of such a bizarre presidential race, his machinations are starting to look almost viable. There are several parallels between Underwood's re-election campaign and the 2016 campaigns of Donald Trump, Ted Cruz, Hillary Clinton and Bernie Sanders.

=== Season 5 ===
Spacey's performance as Frank Underwood in Season 5—along with the series itself—received mixed reviews. Emily VanDerWerff of Vox Media called Spacey's performance "hamstanding", and said, "It's as if House of Cards wants to make Frank go full authoritarian dictator, but lacks the wherewithal to actually push its reality toward some sort of alternate dystopia." The Hollywood Reporter's Daniel Flenberg called Spacey's Underwood "increasingly broad and hammy" in season 5, while Time's Daniel D'addario wrote that the character was too one-dimensional to elicit a good performance from Spacey: "Underwood isn't Nixonian or Clintonian (pick your villain); he's a flat character for whom recognition is its own reward. This may make the show a surprisingly good fit for our times. But onscreen as in life, the desire for fame alone is insufficient motivation to compel viewers to stay tuned."

Other critics praised him, however. "Spacey's honeysuckle drawl and flinty-eyed leer are as amusing as ever. He's almost always the broadest performer in any given room, but that's part of the show's design—a way of drawing us into the character's almost omnisciently evil mindset," wrote Vulture.com's Matt Zoller Seitz. Entertainment Weekly's Jeff Jensen wrote, "Spacey seems invigorated by the material, and perhaps, our moment. He's certainly buffed and honed Frank to a shine while grounding it, scuffing it, by playing to mortality and age. He's an All-Star Survivor, but a gray one."

Critics noted that the character of Underwood gained a new resonance when considered in the context of the Trump administration. "In a deliciously cynical flourish, the commander-in-chief's response to whisperings about his misdeeds is to conjure a bogeyman in the shape of terrorist group Ico, which he presents as a clear and imminent danger to America," Ed Power wrote for The Telegraph. "This yields the returning series's first stone-cold Trump-ism as Underwood announces plans to shut America's borders to unwelcome outsiders. Real world events are further echoed as protestors gather outside the White House chanting 'not my President'."

=== Awards and nominations ===
At the 3rd Critics' Choice Television Awards, Spacey was nominated for Best Actor in a Drama Series for his portrayal of Underwood.

On July 18, 2013, Netflix earned the first Primetime Emmy Award nominations for original online only web television for the 65th Primetime Emmy Awards. Three of its web series, Arrested Development, Hemlock Grove, and House of Cards, earned nominations. For the first time, three Primetime Emmy nominations for lead roles were from web television series: Outstanding Lead Actor in a Drama Series to Spacey for his portrayal of Frank Underwood, Outstanding Lead Actress in a Drama Series to Robin Wright for her portrayal of Claire Underwood, and Outstanding Lead Actor in a Comedy Series to Jason Bateman for his portrayal of Michael Bluth in Arrested Development. Spacey submitted "Chapter 1" for consideration to earn his nomination. Spacey also earned a Golden Globe nomination for Best Actor in a Television Series Drama and a Screen Actors Guild nomination for Outstanding Performance by a Male Actor in a Drama Series nominations.

In season 2, Spacey won the Golden Globe for Best Actor in a Television Series Drama at the 72nd Golden Globe Awards and Screen Actors Guild Outstanding Performance by a Male Actor in a Drama Series at the 21st Screen Actors Guild Awards, as well as nominations for Primetime Emmy Award for Outstanding Lead Actor in a Drama Series at the 66th Primetime Emmy Awards and a Screen Actors Guild nomination for Outstanding by an Ensemble in a Drama Series.

In season 3, Spacey was nominated for Primetime Emmy Award for Outstanding Lead Actor in a Drama Series at the 67th Primetime Emmy Awards, his third nomination for the role. He also was nominated for both Outstanding Performance by a Male Actor in a Drama Series and Outstanding Performance by an Ensemble in a Drama Series at the 22nd Screen Actors Guild Awards.

For his performance in season 4, Spacey earned a nomination for Primetime Emmy Award for Outstanding Lead Actor in a Drama Series at the 68th Primetime Emmy Awards.

For his performance in season 5, Spacey received his fifth consecutive Primetime Emmy Award for Outstanding Lead Actor in a Drama Series nomination for the 69th Primetime Emmy Awards.
