= Chief Whip of the Conservative Party =

Party official who oversees the whipping system in the party

The Chief Whip of the Conservative Party oversees the whipping system in the party, which is responsible for ensuring that Conservative MPs or members of the House of Lords attend and vote in parliament in the desired way of the party leadership. Chief Whips, of which two are appointed in the party, a member of the House of Commons and a member of the House of Lords, also help to organise their party's contribution to parliamentary business.

The party leadership may allow members to have a free vote based on their own conscience rather than party policy, which means the chief whip is not required to influence the way members vote.

This is a list of people who have served as Chief Whip of the Conservative Party, previously the Tory Party, in the Parliament of the United Kingdom.

== House of Commons ==
Chief Whip of the Conservative Party

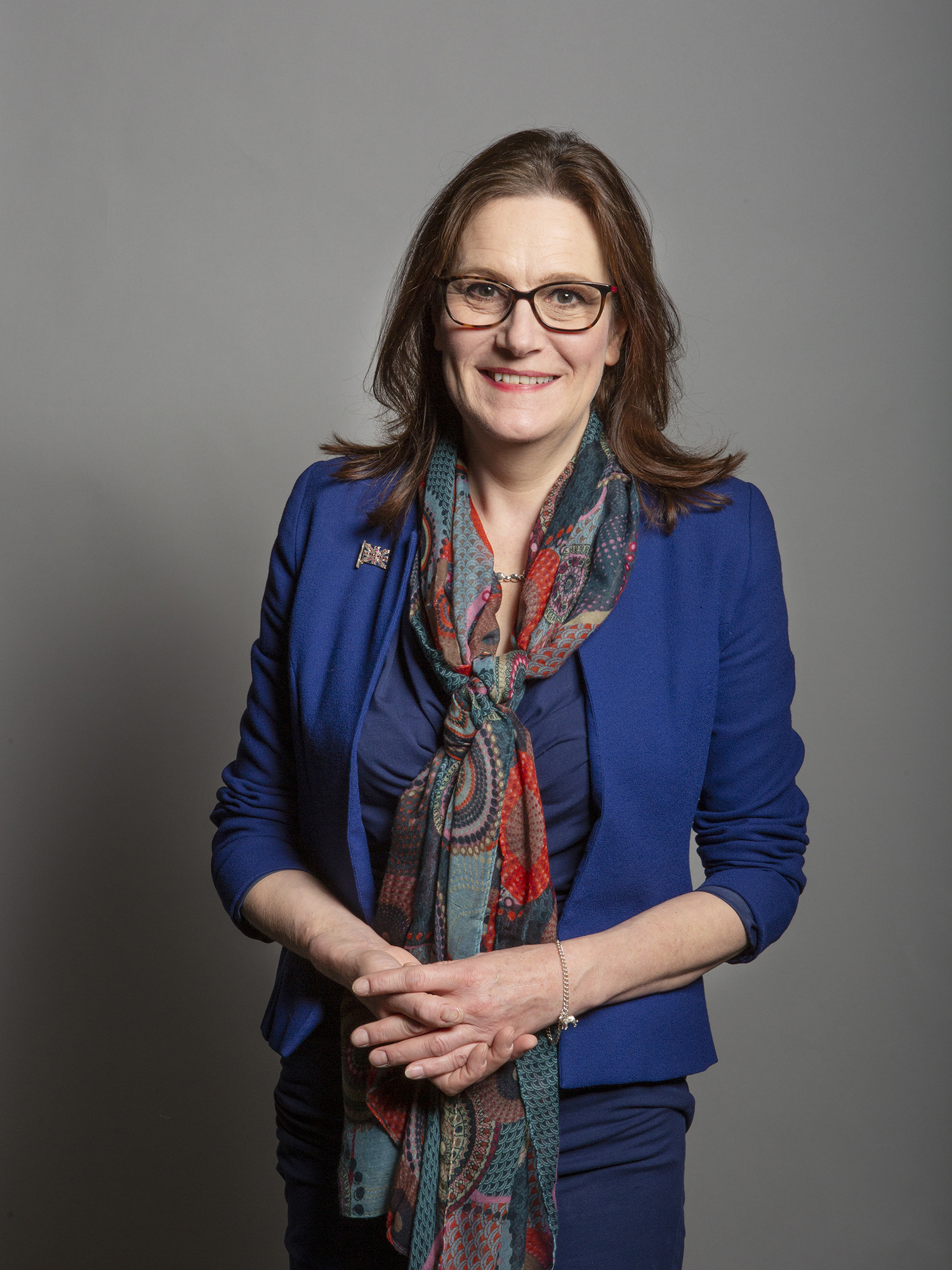
- Incumbent; Dame Rebecca Harris since 4 November 2024
- Appointer: Leader of the Conservative Party
- Inaugural holder: William Holmes
- Formation: circa 1802

Year	Name	Constituency
circa 1802	William Holmes	Haslemere
1835	Sir George Clerk	Midlothian (Edinburghshire)
1837	Sir Thomas Francis Fremantle	Buckingham
1844	Sir John Young	County Cavan
1846	William Beresford	Harwich
1850	Forbes Mackenzie	Peeblesshire
1853	Sir William Jolliffe	Petersfield
1859	Colonel Thomas Edward Taylor	County Dublin
1868	Gerard Noel	Rutland
1873	Colonel Thomas Edward Taylor	County Dublin
1874	Sir William Hart Dyke	Mid Kent
1880	Rowland Winn	North Lincolnshire
1885	Aretas Akers-Douglas	St Augustine's
1895	Sir William Hood Walrond	Tiverton
1902	Sir Alexander Acland Hood	Wellington
1911	Lord Balcarres	Chorley
1913	Lord Edmund Talbot	Chichester
1921	Leslie Wilson	Reading
1923	Bolton Eyres-Monsell (knighted in 1929)	Evesham
1931	David Margesson	Rugby
1941	James Stuart	Moray and Nairn
1948	Patrick Buchan-Hepburn	East Toxteth
1955	Edward Heath	Bexley
1959	Martin Redmayne	Rushcliffe
1964	William Whitelaw	Penrith and The Border
1970	Francis Pym	Cambridgeshire
1973	Humphrey Atkins	Spelthorne
1979	Michael Jopling	Westmorland
1983	John Wakeham	Colchester and Maldon
1987	David Waddington	Ribble Valley
1989	Timothy Renton	Mid Sussex
1990	Richard Ryder	Mid Norfolk
1994	Alastair Goodlad	Eddisbury
1997	James Arbuthnot	North East Hampshire
2001	David Maclean	Penrith and The Border
2005	Patrick McLoughlin	West Derbyshire (2005–2010); Derbyshire Dales (2010–2012)
2012 (September)	Andrew Mitchell	Sutton Coldfield
2012 (October)	Sir George Young	North West Hampshire
2014	Michael Gove	Surrey Heath
2015	Mark Harper	Forest of Dean
2016–17	Gavin Williamson	South Staffordshire
2017–2019	Julian Smith	Skipton and Ripon
2019–2022	Mark Spencer	Sherwood
2022 (February)	Chris Heaton-Harris	Daventry
2022 (September)	Wendy Morton	Aldridge-Brownhills
2022 (October)	Simon Hart	Carmarthen West and South Pembrokeshire
2024 (July)	Stuart Andrew	Daventry
2024 (November)	Rebecca Harris	Castle Point

== House of Lords ==
Chief Whip of the Conservative Party

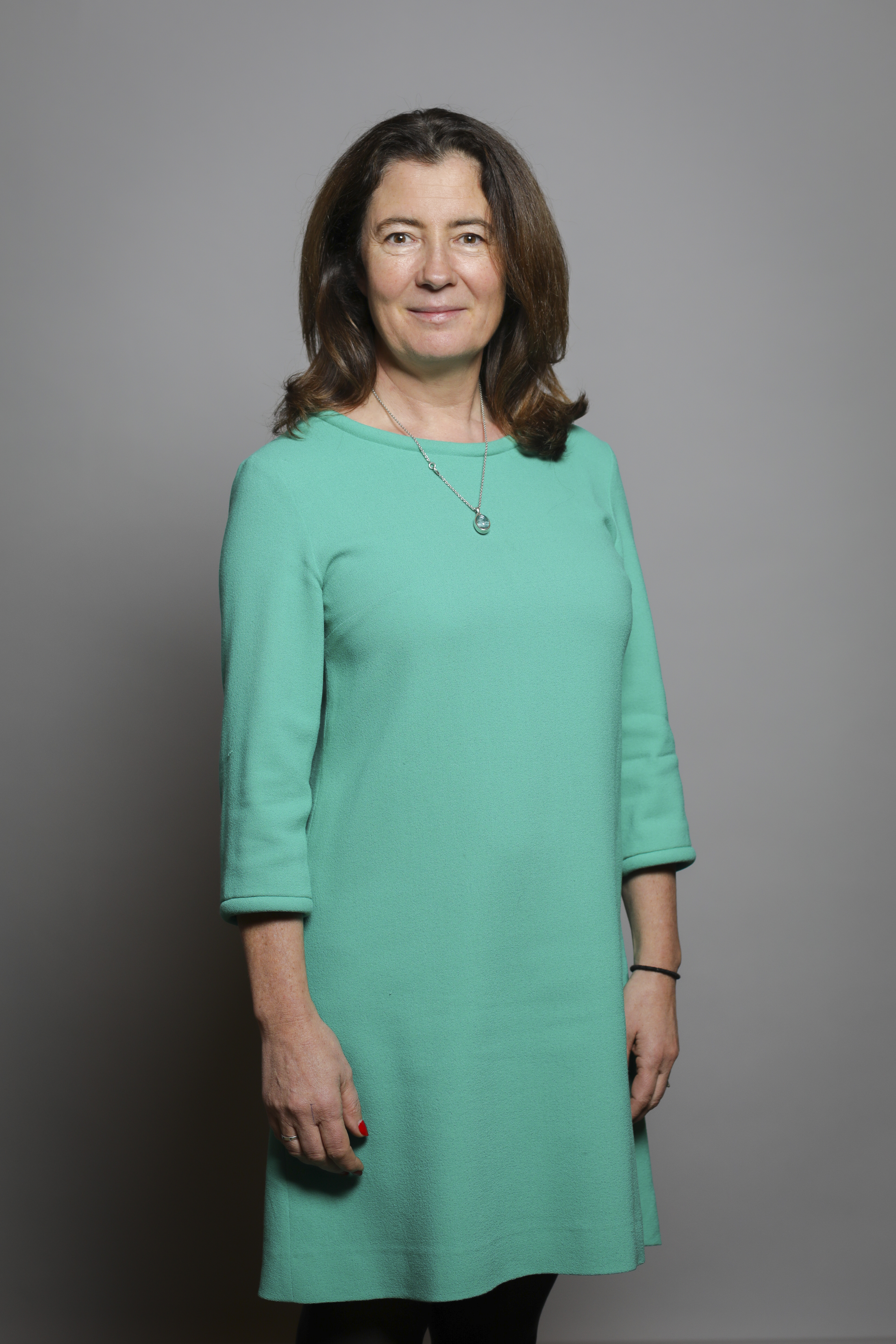
- Incumbent; Susan Williams, Baroness Williams of Trafford since 19 July 2024
- Appointer: Leader of the Conservative Party
- Inaugural holder: The 3rd Earl Nelson
- Formation: before 1852

Year	Name
before 1852	The Earl Nelson
1852	The Lord Colville of Culross
c.1870	The Lord Skelmersdale (created Earl of Lathom in 1880)
1885	The Earl of Kintore
1889	The Earl of Limerick
1896	The Earl Waldegrave
1911	The Duke of Devonshire
1916	The Lord Hylton
1922	The Earl of Clarendon
1925	The Earl of Plymouth
1929	The Earl of Lucan
1940	The Lord Templemore
1945	The Earl Fortescue
1957	The Earl St Aldwyn
1977	The Lord Denham
1991	The Lord Hesketh
1993	The Viscount Ullswater
1994	The Lord Strathclyde
1998	The Lord Henley
2001	The Lord Cope of Berkeley
2007	The Lady Anelay of St Johns
2014	The Lord Taylor of Holbeach
2019	The Lord Ashton of Hyde
2022	The Baroness Williams of Trafford

== In popular culture ==
Francis Urquhart is a fictional Conservative Chief Whip, created by Michael Dobbs, formerly Chief of Staff for British Conservative Prime Minister Margaret Thatcher. Urquhart was the main character in Dobbs's trilogy of books, that were turned into successful BBC television dramas in the 1990s. The first book in the trilogy, House of Cards, was adapted and broadcast by the BBC in 1990. This was subsequently followed by a 1993 adaptation of the second element of the trilogy, To Play The King. The third part, The Final Cut, aired in 1995. The trilogy charts Urquhart's ambitious rise through his party's ranks until he becomes Prime Minister. Urquhart was played by Ian Richardson.

== See also ==
- Chief Whip of the Labour Party
- Chief Whip of the Liberal Democrats
- Chief Whip of Reform UK

== Sources ==
- Chris Cook and Brendan Keith, British Historical Facts 1830–1900, Macmillan, 1975, pp. 92–93.
- David Butler and Gareth Butler, Twentieth-Century British Historical Facts 1900–2000, Macmillan, 2000.
