= House of Cards (novel) =

1989 novel by Michael Dobbs

- First edition
- Author: Michael Dobbs
- Language: English
- Series: House of Cards trilogy
- Genre: Political thriller
- Publisher: HarperCollins
- Publication date: July 1989
- Publication place: United Kingdom
- Pages: 384
- ISBN: 1492606618
- OCLC: 880303283
- Followed by: To Play the King
- Website: www.michaeldobbs.com/house-of-cards/

House of Cards is a political thriller novel by British author Michael Dobbs. Published in 1989, it tells the story of Francis Urquhart, a fictional Chief Whip of the Conservative Party, and his amoral and manipulative scheme to become leader of the governing party and, thus, Prime Minister of the United Kingdom.

A television adaptation, written by Andrew Davies and produced by the BBC, was aired in 1990. A six-part radio adaptation of the first novel, written by Neville Teller aired on BBC Radio 4 in 1996. In 2013, the serial and the Dobbs novel were the basis for an American television adaptation set in Washington, D.C., commissioned and released by Netflix.

== Background ==
Michael Dobbs began working for the Conservative Party in 1977, and from 1986 to 1987, served as Prime Minister Margaret Thatcher's Chief of Staff. Dobbs fell out with Thatcher during a cabinet meeting on 4 June 1987, exactly one week before that year's general election. Thatcher was concerned she would lose the election, and according to one participant at the meeting, she was "almost hysterical, with her arms sweeping everywhere". According to Dobbs, "It all started because Maggie Thatcher beat me up and was actually rather cruel to me. She took out all her pain and anger and frustration on me, when in fact I was perhaps the most innocent person in the room at the time."

Shortly after leaving his post as Chief of Staff in 1987, Dobbs and his wife visited Malta on holiday. While sitting beside a swimming pool in Malta, Dobbs scribbled the letters "FU" and a drawing of two raised middle fingers on a piece of a paper. The letters would become the initials of House of Cards protagonist, Francis Urquhart. Dobbs stated that he had not planned to write the book saying, "None of this was planned. It was all a bit of a joke, an accident. I had no intention of being a writer, or even finishing the book. It was just a holiday distraction." Dobbs insists that it is not a "book of revenge", but "most of the stuff I put into House of Cards was material from events I'd either seen, or participated in, or done, or watched other people do." Dobbs has also stated that the book was not a comment on contemporary politics, and also drew inspiration from the works of Shakespeare.

== Plot ==
Following the resignation of Prime Minister Margaret Thatcher, the ruling Conservative Party is about to elect a new leader. In the subsequent leadership election, the moderate but indecisive Henry "Hal" Collingridge emerges victorious. Francis Urquhart, an MP and the Government Chief Whip in the House of Commons, is secretly contemptuous of the well-meaning but weak Collingridge, but expects a promotion to a senior position in the Cabinet. After the general election, which the party wins by a reduced majority, Urquhart submits a memorandum to Collingridge advocating a cabinet reshuffle that would include a prominent ministerial position for Urquhart himself. However, Collingridge—citing Harold Macmillan's political demise after the 1962 Night of the Long Knives—effects no changes at all. Urquhart resolves to oust Collingridge.

Urquhart exploits his position as Chief Whip to undermine Collingridge by leaking inside information to the press, and (using £50,000 given by a party donor) engineering an insider trading scandal implicating Charles Collingridge, the Prime Minister's alcoholic, financially insolvent brother. Most of his leaks are to Mattie Storin, a young reporter for The Daily Telegraph. After Collingridge is ultimately forced to resign, Urquhart then eliminates his enemies in the resulting leadership contest by means of fabricated scandals that he sets up himself or publicizes. These include threatening to publish photographs of Education Secretary Harold Earle in the company of a rent boy; causing Health Secretary Peter MacKenzie to accidentally run over a disabled man; and forcing Foreign Secretary Patrick Woolton to withdraw by blackmailing him with an audiotape of a one-night stand, who in turn endorses Urquhart in the hope of being appointed Chancellor of the Exchequer as reward and eventually succeeding him. His remaining rival, Environment Secretary Michael Samuels, is alleged by the press to have supported far-left politics as a university student. Urquhart thereby reaches the brink of victory.

Prior to the final ballot, Urquhart murders the party's drug-addicted and increasingly unstable public relations consultant, Roger O'Neill, whom he forced into helping him to remove Collingridge from office. Urquhart invites O'Neill to his country house near Southampton, gets him drunk, and puts rat poison in his cocaine. Mattie untangles Urquhart's web and confronts him in the deserted roof garden of the Houses of Parliament. In response, Urquhart commits suicide by jumping off the roof.

=== Revision ===
After the initial TV series the author revised the published novel to bring it in line with the British TV series, in which Urquhart throws Mattie from the roof rather than committing suicide, thus allowing for a continuation of the story. The name of the newspaper that Mattie Storin works for was changed from The Daily Telegraph to the fictional The Chronicle, same as the TV series.

== Sequels ==
The novel was followed by two sequels: To Play the King and The Final Cut. Both were adapted for television by the BBC and aired in 1993 and 1995, respectively.

== Adaptations ==
- House of Cards, a 1990 television series written by Andrew Davies, and produced by the BBC.
- House of Cards, a 2013 series based on the BBC series and the novel, set in Washington, D.C., commissioned and released by Netflix.
