= Diane Fletcher =

English actress

Diane Fletcher (born 17 April 1944) is an English actress. She graduated from the Royal Academy of Dramatic Art in 1966.

Fletcher was born in Derby, England. She played Nancy in Fairly Secret Army, and has appeared in other popular British television shows such as Coronation Street as Angela Hawthorne (1994–1995, 2005), Inspector Morse, Agatha Christie's Poirot, Within These Walls, Midsomer Murders and Heartbeat. In 1971 she appeared in No One Was Saved at the Royal Court Theatre schools scheme. Her first film was Roman Polanski's Macbeth.

In 1996 she appeared in Agatha Christie’s Poirot “Murder in the Links” as Eloise Renauld.

In 1999 she appeared in Midsomer Murders “Death of a Stranger” as Marcia Tranter and in Aristocrats as Duchess of Richmond.

In the BBC adaptation of House of Cards and its sequels To Play the King and The Final Cut, Fletcher played Elizabeth Urquhart, wife of the murderous Chief Whip of the Conservative Party and later Prime Minister Francis Urquhart (played by Ian Richardson).

In 2014 she appeared in Endeavour Season 2 Episode 2 "Nocturne" as Miss Bronwen Symes, the Headmistress of a school for girls.
