= List of House of Cards trilogy characters =

House of Cards is a British political drama television series created by Andrew Davies and is based on the 1989 novel by Michael Dobbs. Below is a list consisting of the many characters who have appeared throughout the series.

== Francis Urquhart ==
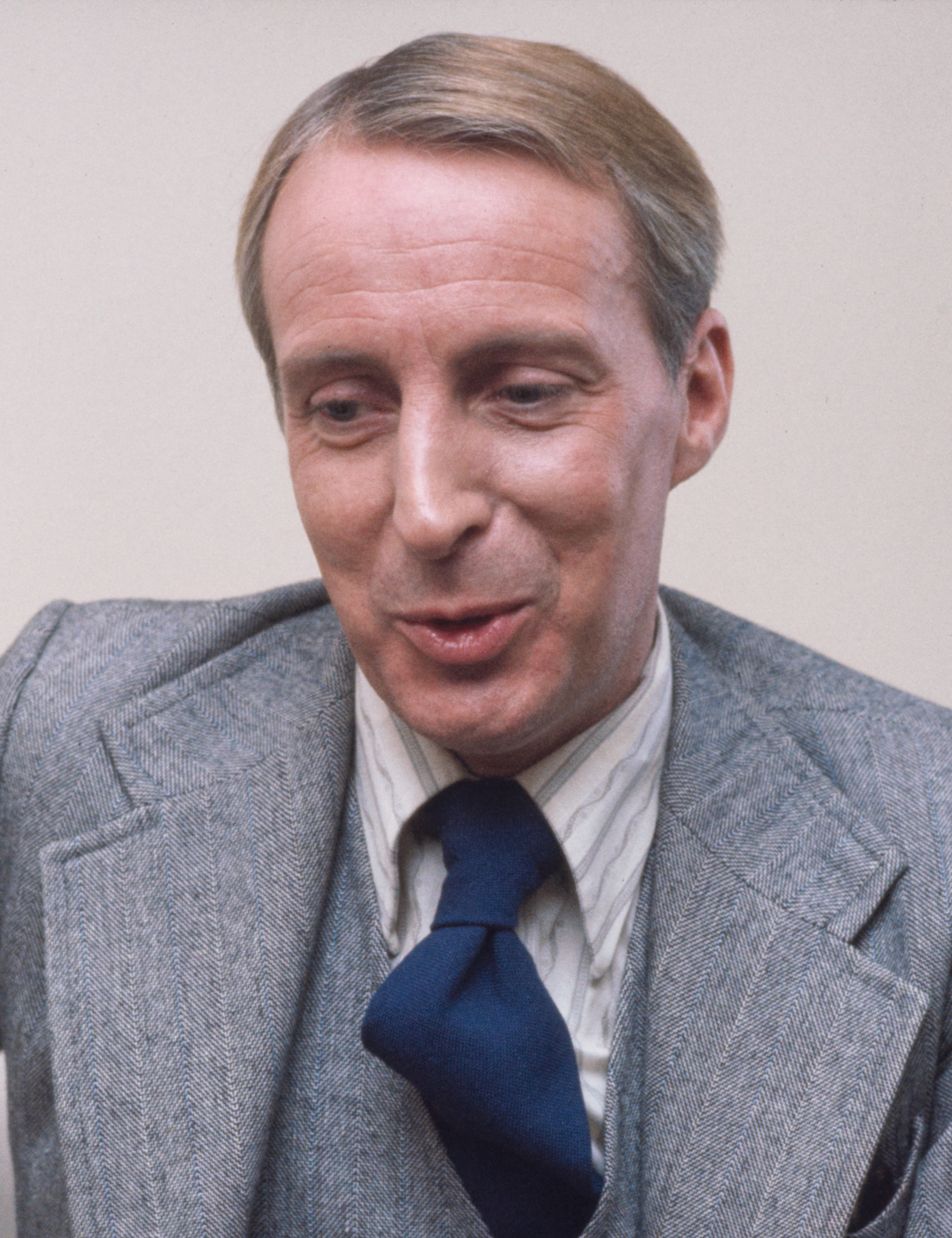
Ian Richardson

Francis Urquhart (Ian Richardson) is the main character in Dobbs's House of Cards trilogy of novels and television series: House of Cards (1990), To Play the King (1993) and The Final Cut (1995). A Conservative and the government Chief Whip with roots in the Scottish aristocracy, Urquhart manoeuvres himself through blackmail, manipulation and murder to the post of prime minister. To Play the King sees Prime Minister Urquhart clash with the newly crowned king of the United Kingdom over disagreements regarding social justice. By the time of The Final Cut, Urquhart has been in power for 11 years, and refuses to relinquish his position until he has beaten Margaret Thatcher's record as longest serving post-war Prime Minister.

Thought to be based on Richard III and Macbeth, Urquhart is characterised by his habitual breaking of the fourth wall, his quoting of Shakespeare, and his usage of the catchphrase, "You might very well think that; I couldn't possibly comment", or a variation thereon, as a plausibly deniable way of agreeing with people and/or leaking information.

== Elizabeth Urquhart ==
Elizabeth Urquhart (Diane Fletcher) (created Countess Urquhart after her husband's death), is Francis Urquhart's wife. She appears to have a great deal of power over her husband, and often identifies his powers and abilities, or persuades him to use a given situation to his advantage. When Prime Minister Henry Collingridge overlooks Francis for a Cabinet promotion, it is Elizabeth who encourages Francis to plot to remove Collingridge and take office himself. In series one episode two, she also suggests Francis begin an affair with Mattie Storin so that he may further secure her trust and loyalty, and thus better use his position to feed information to her, thereby influencing her articles.

It is implied in the first installment of the trilogy that it is her idea, not Francis', to murder Roger O'Neill, a colleague whom Francis had been using to his advantage. Unlike her husband, who clearly feels remorse after killing, she is cold and callous, and does not seem to have a problem with arranging murders to suit their purposes. However, she appears to truly love her husband and kills him to spare him the disgrace of exposure, resignation, trial, life imprisonment, and eternal historical damnation.

In the TV version of The Final Cut, she has Francis murdered to secure their legacies and her pension. Before he dies, she, her right eye spattered with his blood, lovingly holds him in her arms and assures him: "Francis... my dear... you're safe now. It was the only way, my darling. You do understand?" Likewise, Urquhart's love for Elizabeth is shown by his last word, a gurgled, deathlike "Elizabeth".

In the first book, she is called Miranda.

== Tim Stamper, MP ==
Tim Stamper (Colin Jeavons) is one of Francis Urquhart's closest friends and aides. In the first series, he is a Junior Whip to Urquhart as Chief Whip; in the second series, he is Chief Whip and later Chairman of the Conservative Party. Stamper did not appear in the House of Cards novel on which the BBC series was based, though the series' author, Michael Dobbs, introduced him in its sequel, To Play the King (1993).

In the first instalment of the House of Cards trilogy, Stamper is an Urquhart loyalist and like Urquhart is described as being on the "hard right" of the Conservative Party. By To Play the King, however, he is embittered and feels that his loyalty and efforts are unappreciated when he is passed over for Home Secretary in a cabinet reshuffle despite Urquhart's promise of the appointment (ironically, Collingridge's refusal to appoint Urquhart to the Home Office had previously incited Urquhart to engineer his downfall). As a result, Stamper decides to release to the police a tape incriminating Urquhart in the murders of Mattie Storin and Roger O'Neill. When Urquhart becomes aware of these plans, he has Corder murder Stamper and Sarah Harding, one of his own personal aides to whom Stamper had given a copy of the tape, with car bombs.

Stamper appeared to have unfortunate delusions of grandeur; his plan was to force Urqhuart's resignation and replace him as prime minister, albeit with a deal of sadness at having to do it. He stated that all he ever wished to do was to serve Urquhart, and it is clear from both House of Cards and parts of To Play the King that Stamper would have been loyal to Urquhart until the end. However it is Urquhart's cruel acts of throwing Stamper's loyalty back into his face that drove the latter to try and ruin his old master.

== Mattie Storin ==
Mattie Storin (Susannah Harker) is a journalist for the fictional Chronicle, who becomes romantically involved with Francis Urquhart. He acts as an anonymous source for many of her stories, using her to discredit his rivals in the press. Their relationship, of which Urquhart's wife is aware, is paternal as well as sexual; she calls him "Daddy", and is attracted to him in part because he is old enough to be her father.

By the end of House of Cards, Urquhart decides he can no longer trust her, and throws her off the fictitious roof garden of the House of Commons.

Michael Dobbs chose the character's name based on Matthew V. Storin, a male journalist, who was a colleague of Dobbs' at The Boston Globe in the 1970s and later became editor of The Globe (1993–2001).

== Lord Billsborough ==
Lord Theodore "Teddy" Billsborough (Nicholas Selby; named "Williams" in the novel) is the Chairman of the Conservative Party, acting as an unofficial right hand to Henry Collingridge. He is a skilled insider politician, but too old to run for a leadership, with his peerage barring him from becoming prime minister. Well known for his political impartiality, Billsborough is Michael Samuels' mentor. Urquhart uses Billsborough as a scapegoat for his various leaks, hinting to Mattie Storin that he is undermining Collingridge so Samuels can run for leader in the near future. Collingridge finally fires Billsborough after Urquhart names him as the traitor.

== Michael Samuels, MP ==
Michael Samuels (Damien Thomas) is the Environment Secretary, aligned with the "liberal" faction. Young, smart and attractive, Urquhart dislikes him owing to his fast rise in the party and his Jewish background. Samuels is a frontrunner and ultimately Urquhart's chief rival for the Conservative leadership when Collingridge resigns. However, he lost the election when an anonymous source (secretly Urquhart) leaks that Samuels, whilst at university, was near to the Communist Party and supported denuclearization and gay rights.

== Corder ==
Corder (Nick Brimble) serves as Francis Urquhart's bodyguard and is responsible for most of the assassinations carried out on Urquhart's behalf. He appears to feel no compassion for the people he kills.

It is implied in To Play The King that Corder is having an affair with Mrs Urquhart.

Corder is responsible for the assassinations of Tim Stamper and Sarah Harding, two people who had originally been Prime Minister Urquhart's most loyal supporters but who had decided to expose him with a tape implicating him in the murders of Mattie Storin and Roger O'Neill. (Corder has their cars rigged with bombs, killing them both). Stamper wants Urquhart removed so he can replace him, while Harding is genuinely horrified that her boss and lover committed murder to take the leadership.

At the unveiling of Margaret Thatcher's statue, Corder has Urquhart and Evanghelos Passolides killed by a sniper on a balcony above Parliament Square, just after the memorial is honoured with the song "God Save the King". Passolides was investigating the deaths of his brothers, Georgios and Euripides, whom Urquhart murdered on his tour of duty in Cyprus in 1956.

== Sarah Harding ==
Sarah Harding (Kitty Aldridge) is appointed Francis Urquhart's media adviser in To Play The King. A former Cambridge academic and journalist ("Did you write in The Economist that 'Francis Urquhart is like the shark: he has to keep moving forwards to stay alive'?" Francis asks.). She then went on to work for a polling company before becoming the Prime Minister's "slave", his political adviser.

After being made partially aware of Urquhart's involvement with Mattie Storin, she becomes Urquhart's lover, despite being married, and then starts to become obsessed with him.

As Urquhart wins his tussle against the king, Sarah becomes more aware of some of the dubious aspects of Urquhart's administration, and Stamper makes her aware of his involvement in Mattie Storin's death. Corder assassinates her via a car bomb on the day after the election, on her way to meet one of the king's advisers in order, it is implied, to hand over a tape which implicates Urquhart in Mattie Storin's death.

In the novel, her character is very different, and her name is Sally Quinn.

== The King ==
The King (Michael Kitchen) is Urquhart's antagonist in To Play The King. Having recently succeeded his mother as monarch, he is determined to play a more active role in government, but Urquhart thwarts the new king's initial attempts.

As his and Urquhart's relationship deteriorates, the King starts to raise issues against government policy, causing the government to lose popularity. As Urquhart faces re-election, the King organises a nationwide tour to highlight the issue of homelessness. He is humiliated in a dirty trick, and Urquhart wins re-election, much to the king's displeasure.

After his re-election, Urquhart demands the King's abdication. Although the King cautions Urquhart that he will continue to fight his policies, he concedes and steps down from the throne, and is succeeded by his teenage son.

In the novel, it is the king who decides to abdicate, against Urquhart's wishes and plans.

== Sir Bruce Bullerby ==
Sir Bruce Bullerby (David Ryall), known as the pit bull, is proprietor and editor-in-chief of The Clarion, a UK tabloid newspaper, who appears in To Play The King and The Final Cut.

It is evident that Sir Bruce gained his knighthood for vigorously supporting the Government's policies ("The pit bull has bitten quite a few legs in the cause", says Stamper) but his support wavers when the king raises issues of compassion, and then when Makepeace makes his bid for the leadership. Urquhart blackmails Bullerby with compromising photographs, and he tries (and fails) to bribe Bullerby with an implied offer of a peerage.

He does not appear in any of the novels.

== Tom Makepeace, MP ==
Tom Makepeace (Paul Freeman) served under Francis Urquhart as deputy prime minister and Foreign Secretary, then as prime minister. He and Urquhart frequently clashed over Europe and various domestic policies.

Following a major dispute with Urquhart over Urquhart's proposal of a single language for Europe, Makepeace was fired from the Cabinet. He was offered the post of Secretary of State for Education (seen as a traditional "dumping ground" post) but declined it. Enraged, he resigns from the Cabinet and attacks Urquhart repeatedly from the opposition benches.

Makepeace challenged the Prime Minister for the leadership of the Conservative Party. He failed to win the first ballot but managed to force a second one, and planned to use recently obtained evidence of Urquhart's criminal activities to undermine his position. However, Urquhart was killed before the second ballot, thus enabling Makepeace to win the election unopposed.

In the book, Makepeace does not challenge Urquhart for the leadership but instead leads a popular movement to undermine the prime minister and his leadership. He is present when Urquhart is shot but does not win the Premiership after being tainted by his association with Passolides. The Premiership goes to Maxwell Stanbrook, the Environment Secretary.

== Henry Collingridge, MP ==
Henry "Hal" Collingridge (David Lyon) succeeds Margaret Thatcher as prime minister in House of Cards.

Collingridge is portrayed as being a decent man and a passive, indecisive leader who relies heavily on the support of his Cabinet Ministers and trusted cronies like Francis Urquhart and Lord "Teddy" Billsborough. At the start of the novel (and TV adaptation) he has just led his party to victory in a general election (albeit with a very reduced majority, losing at least 70 seats).

In his first reshuffle he makes the decision not to make any changes to the government, arguing that a massive shake-up could be misconstrued as panic. A furious Urquhart is therefore passed over for promotion, so begins plotting his revenge.

Collingridge's brief time in office proves difficult for him thanks to Urquhart, who embarrasses his boss by leaking delicate information to the press and one of the Labour Party backbenchers, Stephen Kendrick. He then fabricates a scandal concerning Collingridge's alcoholic brother and insider trading, which forces the prime minister to resign after a short period in office, never once suspecting Urquhart's betrayal.

He is succeeded by Urquhart, whom, in a final twist of irony, Collingridge offers to support.

== Patrick Woolton, MP ==
Patrick Woolton (Malcolm Tierney) is a minor character in the first installment. He serves as Foreign Secretary under Henry Collingridge. In House of Cards, Urquhart describes Woolton as "'a lout, a lecher, an anti-Semite, a racist, and a bully'", but adds that he is "more intelligent than he seems" and should not be underestimated.

Woolton makes two unsuccessful bids for the leadership of the Conservative Party. In the first contest, he loses to Collingridge; in the second, Urquhart anonymously blackmails Woolton into withdrawing by sending him an audio cassette of him having loud sex with Penny Guy, Roger O'Neill's assistant and mistress. Woolton vows that he will be back but is absent from the later sequels.

== Geoffrey Booza-Pitt, MP ==
Geoffrey Booza-Pitt (Nickolas Grace) is a lesser member of Urquhart's Cabinet (mentioned at one stage as Chancellor of the Duchy of Lancaster) in The Final Cut. He is something of a "character", cheerfully upper-class with a slightly eccentric sense of humour, notable for wearing colourful waistcoats and bow ties. Urquhart promotes him to Foreign Secretary as an insult to the departing Tom Makepeace. He is an Urquhart loyalist, and in any case lacks the credibility to be a rival, and his popular image as an amiable buffoon humiliates his predecessor. He has a reputation as Urquhart's "glove-puppet" (as Tom Makepeace calls him in his statement of resignation) and is consequently nicknamed "Sooty" by both the Opposition and other Members of the Cabinet and Parliamentary Party.

Before his appointment, Booza-Pitt is forced to admit to an extra-marital affair by Urquhart and, while no action is taken immediately, is made to sign a corresponding statement of resignation which Urquhart keeps in his desk as leverage against him. When Urquhart's position becomes increasingly untenable during Makepeace's leadership challenge, Booza-Pitt attempts to resign on his own terms, hoping to create the perception that he is taking a principled stand against the prime minister, but is presumably disgraced when Urquhart publishes his earlier resignation letter instead.

The Booza-Pitt of the book is similar to the TV version in many respects. However, he is Transport Secretary to start with and later Home Secretary, and has an affair with his Party constituency chairman's wife. His political career survives under Urquhart's successor, Maxwell Stanbrook.

== Claire Carlsen, MP ==
Claire Carlsen (Isla Blair) is a backbencher whose ability and intelligence prompts Urquhart to appoint her Parliamentary Private Secretary to the Prime Minister, even though he knows she is having an affair with his rival, Tom Makepeace. Her sexual and professional relationship with Makepeace gives her the role of double agent: telling many genuine, and sometimes damaging, facts about Makepeace to Urquhart, while at the same time relating Urquhart's cold, evil traits and weaknesses to Makepeace.

In the end, she tries to help Makepeace destroy Urquhart, by fraudulently acquiring a paper documenting Lieutenant Francis Urquhart's killing of Evanghelos Passolides' two brothers in Cyprus in 1956, but Makepeace rejects her help, as he already has the documents. Makepeace shuts her out of his new government, declaring that she is "pure poison" because she is too closely associated with the discredited Urquhart.

Claire is less duplicitous in the novel and, after Urquhart's death, is made a minister.

== Maxwell Stanbrook, MP ==
In the novel The Final Cut, Max Stanbrook is a Minister in Francis Urquhart's government whom Urquhart promoted to Environment Secretary after the Prime Minister sacks Annita Burke. Stanbrook is put in charge of preventing the construction of the Thatcher statue by Urquhart. When Stanbrook can't find a reason to stop its construction, Urquhart gives him a lecture about following orders. He is later revealed to be Jewish and of dubious parentage. After Urquhart is killed, it is Stanbrook who prevails over harsh candidates like Arthur Bollingroke to become prime minister. Stanbrook (thanks to Urquhart's death, which granted a sympathy vote) wins a landslide majority in Parliament.

He does not appear in the TV version.
