= Aside =

Narrative device used in literature

An aside is a dramatic device in which a character speaks to the audience. By convention, the audience is to realize that the character's speech is unheard by the other characters on stage. It may be addressed to the audience expressly (in character or out) or represent an unspoken thought. An aside is usually a brief comment rather than a speech, such as a monologue or soliloquy.

The aside was used by Ian Richardson's character Francis Urquhart in the 1990 BBC mini-series House of Cards, as well as by Kevin Spacey's character Frank Underwood in the 2013 Netflix original series of the same name. It can be used to explain the often complex politics on the show, describe what the character's plans/emotions are or simply for humorous effect.

It was also used by Michaela Coel's character Tracey in the Channel 4 comedy series Chewing Gum; and by the titular character in Fleabag, written and played by Phoebe Waller-Bridge.
