= Jim Parker (composer) =

British composer (1934–2023)

- Birth name: James Mavin Parker
- Born: 18 December 1934; Hartlepool, County Durham, England
- Died: 28 July 2023 (aged 88)
- Occupation: Composer

James Mavin Parker (18 December 1934 – 28 July 2023) was a British BAFTA-winning composer.

== Career ==
After graduating as a silver medallist at the Guildhall School of Music, Parker played with orchestras and chamber groups in London as well as being a key part of The Barrow Poets for whom he provided both original instrumental music and music to accompany the performance of a wide range of poetry spoken or sung by the rest of the band. This music was played on a variety of instruments including the bass cacofiddle, a homemade sort of double bass with knobs on, invented and played by William Bealby-Wright, while Parker mostly played oboe and cor anglais.

Parker subsequently concentrated on composing and conducting. He had early success with a series of recordings in which he set the poems of the British Poet Laureate Sir John Betjeman to music; Banana Blush, Late Flowering Love (both 1974), Sir John Betjeman's Britain (1977) and Varsity Rag (1981). The albums, in which the poet recited his own words and the composer conducted a small group of musicians, have continued to be held in high regard by listeners and critics.

These and subsequent records, including Captain Beaky and His Band, with words by Jeremy Lloyd, which topped the charts as both a single and album, led to work in television as well as in London West End theatres, where Parker had three musicals produced. The most successful of these was Follow the Star, with book and lyrics by Wally K Daly. It was originally produced at Chichester and was directed by Wendy Toye.

=== Film and television ===
Film scores include music for numerous feature-length television films and for new prints of the classic silent films Girl Shy, by Harold Lloyd, and The Blot, a 1921 film directed by Lois Weber.

Parker won the British Academy Award for Best Original Television Music four times, and wrote scores for over two hundred programmes. His work in film and television ranged from music for Moll Flanders, Tom Jones, Midsomer Murders, Born and Bred, Foyle's War, The House of Eliott, and Mapp & Lucia to the score for the contemporary political thrillers House of Cards (UK version), To Play the King and The Final Cut. The opening and closing theme music for those television series is entitled "Francis Urquhart's March." With Tom Stanier he wrote the music for schools programmes such as Watch, Zig Zag and Fourways Farm plus musicals such as Blast Off: Mr Jones Goes to Jupiter.

Parker worked on several occasions with Victoria Wood, early on in her career. He arranged the songs for the television adaptation of her play Talent in 1979, as well as its sequel Nearly A Happy Ending in 1980, both of which starred Wood with Julie Walters and a further play Happy Since I Met You in 1982, starring Walters and Duncan Preston. He was also cast as the bandleader of her debut sketch show Wood and Walters.

=== Concert works ===
Concert works were written for the Nash Ensemble, Philip Jones Brass, The Hilliard Ensemble, The Albion Ensemble, The Wallace Collection and Poems on the Underground. His published compositions include "A Londoner in New York" for brass, "Mississippi Five" for wind quintet, "The Golden Section" for brass quintet, and a clarinet concerto. He was also the recipient of an honorary degree from the Guildhall School of Music and Drama.

== Personal life and death ==
Parker married Sonia Levy in 1961 and the couple had one daughter together. The marriage later ended in divorce. He married Pauline George in 1969 and the couple had two daughters together.

Parker died on 28 July 2023, aged 88, following a long illness.
