= House of Cards (British TV series) =

1990 British television serial

- Based on: House of Cards by Michael Dobbs
- Written by: Andrew Davies; Michael Dobbs
- Directed by: Paul Seed
- Starring: Ian Richardson; Susannah Harker; Miles Anderson; Alphonsia Emmanuel; Malcolm Tierney; Diane Fletcher; Colin Jeavons; Damien Thomas; Kenneth Gilbert; David Lyon; Kenny Ireland; James Villiers; Isabelle Amyes
- Theme music composer: Jim Parker
- Country of origin: United Kingdom
- Original language: English
- No. of episodes: 4

Production
- Producer: Ken Riddington
- Running time: 55 minutes
- Production company: BBC

Original release
- Network: BBC1
- Release: 18 November – 9 December 1990

Related
- To Play the King; The Final Cut

House of Cards is a 1990 British political thriller television serial in four episodes, set after the end of Margaret Thatcher's tenure as Prime Minister of the United Kingdom. It was televised by the BBC from 18 November to 9 December 1990. Released to critical and popular acclaim for its writing, direction, and performances, it is considered one of the greatest British television shows ever made.

The story is centred on the sudden and manipulative rise to power of the fictional chief whip of the Conservative Party, Francis Urquhart, a ruthless and Machiavellian politician. Urquhart, on the party's right wing, is frustrated over his lack of promotion in the wake of Margaret Thatcher's resignation and the moderate government which succeeds it. He conceives a calculated and meticulous plan to bring down the new prime minister and succeed him, on the same lines as William Shakespeare's play Richard III (which Urquhart often quotes). During this drawn-out and ruthless coup, his life is complicated by his relationship with a young female reporter named Mattie Storin, whom he uses to leak sensitive information in confidence. The question of whether the serial's ending is a tragedy (in the same vein as Shakespeare's Macbeth) is left to the viewer.

Andrew Davies adapted the story from the 1989 novel of the same name by Michael Dobbs, a former chief of staff at Conservative Party headquarters. Neville Teller also dramatised Dobbs's novel for the BBC World Service in 1996, and it had two television sequels (To Play the King and The Final Cut). The opening and closing theme music for this TV series is entitled "Francis Urquhart's March", by Jim Parker.

House of Cards was ranked 84th in the British Film Institute list of the 100 Greatest British Television Programmes in 2000. In 2013, the serial and the Dobbs novel were the basis for an American adaptation set in Washington, DC, commissioned and released by Netflix as the first ever major streaming service television show. This version was also entitled House of Cards, and starred Kevin Spacey and Robin Wright.

== Overview ==
The antihero of House of Cards is Francis Urquhart, a fictional Chief Whip of the Conservative Party, played by Ian Richardson. The plot follows his amoral and manipulative scheme to become leader of the governing party and, thus, Prime Minister of the United Kingdom.

Michael Dobbs did not envisage writing the second and third books, as Urquhart dies at the end of the first novel. The screenplay of the BBC's dramatisation of House of Cards differs from the book, and hence allows future series. Dobbs wrote two following books, To Play the King and The Final Cut, which were televised in 1993 and 1995, respectively.

House of Cards was said to draw from Shakespeare's plays Macbeth and Richard III, both of which feature main characters who are corrupted by power and ambition. Richardson has a Shakespearean background and said he based his characterisation of Urquhart on Shakespeare's portrayal of Richard III.

Like Richard's asides, Urquhart frequently talks through the camera to the audience, breaking the fourth wall.

== Plot ==
The ruling Conservative Party is about to elect a new leader. Francis Urquhart, the Government Chief Whip in the House of Commons, introduces viewers to the contestants, before Henry Collingridge, the Secretary of State for the Environment, emerges victorious. Urquhart is contemptuous of Collingridge, whom he views as weak and politically too conciliatory. Urquhart feigns respect and expects promotion to a senior position in the Cabinet. After the general election, the party narrowly retains power. Urquhart makes suggestions for a hard-right reshuffle, including his own desired promotion to Home Secretary. However, Collingridge effects no changes at all, relying entirely on the advice of his party chairman, Lord "Teddy" Billsborough. Urquhart resolves to oust Collingridge.

Urquhart begins an affair with Mattie Storin, a junior political reporter at a Conservative-leaning tabloid, The Chronicle. This allows Urquhart to manipulate Mattie and skew her coverage of events in his favour. Another pawn is Roger O'Neill, the party's cocaine-addicted public relations consultant, whom Urquhart blackmails into leaking planned budget cuts, thereby humiliating Collingridge during Prime Minister's Questions. Later, Urquhart blames Billsborough for leaking a poll showing the Conservatives' declining rate in voting intentions, leading Collingridge to sack Billsborough.

As Collingridge's image suffers, Urquhart encourages Patrick Woolton, the boorish and lecherous Foreign Secretary, and the equally unpleasant Chronicle owner Benjamin Landless to support his removal. He also impersonates Collingridge's alcoholic brother to trade shares and benefit from advance information confidential to the government. Collingridge becomes falsely accused of insider trading and resigns partly to save face, partly to care for his brother after he suffers a guilt-induced decline in his health.

In the ensuing leadership race, Urquhart feigns unwillingness to stand before announcing his candidacy. Urquhart makes sure his competitors drop out of the race: Health Secretary Peter MacKenzie accidentally runs his car over a protester at a demonstration staged by Urquhart and withdraws, while Education Secretary Harold Earle is blackmailed into withdrawing when Urquhart anonymously sends pictures of him in the company of a rent boy whom Earle had paid for sex.

The first ballot leaves Urquhart to face Woolton and Michael Samuels, the moderate Environment Secretary. Urquhart eliminates Woolton by a prolonged scheme: at the party conference, he pressures O'Neill into persuading his lover, Penny Guy, to sleep with Woolton in his suite, which Urquhart records via a bugged ministerial red box. The recording reveals Woolton ignoring Guy's pleas to stop, with Woolton ostensibly raping her. When the tape is sent to Woolton, he is led to assume that Samuels is behind the scheme and backs Urquhart in the contest. Urquhart also receives support from Collingridge, who is unaware of Urquhart's role in his own downfall. Samuels is forced out of the running when the tabloids reveal that he backed leftist causes as a student.

Seeing contradictions in the allegations against Collingridge and his brother, Mattie begins to dig deeper, while falling in love with Urquhart and blinding herself to his possible role. On Urquhart's orders, O'Neill vandalises her car and throws a brick with a threatening letter through her window. O'Neill becomes increasingly uneasy with what he is being asked to do, and his addiction adds to his instability. When he threatens to go to the police, Urquhart invites him to his home in Hampshire, promising O'Neill a knighthood. There, O'Neill becomes completely inebriated before passing out. Urquhart mixes O'Neill's cocaine with rat poison, causing him to die after he takes the cocaine in a toilet at a nearby motorway service station.

Mattie's colleague, John Krajewski, insists that Urquhart was the only one with the means, motive and opportunity. Knowing that Urquhart as Chief Whip was adroit at gaining information sensitive enough to blackmail almost anyone, Mattie realises that he is responsible for O'Neill's death and the downfall of his rivals. She confronts Urquhart on the roof garden of the Houses of Parliament, demanding to know if he killed Roger O’Neill. He admits to everything, then throws her off the roof to her death. She lands on the roof of a van parked below. An unseen person picks up Mattie's tape recorder, which she had been using to record her conversations with Urquhart. The series ends with Urquhart, who has defeated Samuels in the second leadership ballot, being driven to Buckingham Palace to be invited to form a government.

== Deviations from the novel ==
In the first novel, but not in the television series:

- Urquhart never speaks directly to the reader; the character is written solely in a third-person perspective.
- When alone, Urquhart is much less self-assured and decisive.
- Mattie Storin works for The Daily Telegraph. (In the television series she is a journalist with the fictional Chronicle newspaper.)
- Mattie Storin does not have a relationship with Urquhart; she does not even talk to him frequently. She does, however, have a sexual relationship with John Krajewski.
- Urquhart's wife is called Miranda and is a minor character, not sharing in his schemes. (In the later novels, To Play the King and The Final Cut, however, she is called "Elizabeth" and plays a larger role, as in the television series.)
- The Conservative party conference is held in Bournemouth. (In the television series it is held in Brighton.)
- The minor character Tim Stamper is introduced for the on-screen adaptation.
- Earle's rent boy appears in person at an important speech of Earle's, distracting him; subsequently, Earle is harassed by reporters who have been told of his indiscretion.
- In the final confrontation scene Urquhart throws himself from the roof terrace and Mattie survives.

Before the series was reissued in 2013 to coincide with the release of the American version of House of Cards, Dobbs rewrote portions of the novel to bring the series in line with the television series and restore continuity among the three novels. In the 2013 version:

- Urquhart murders Mattie Storin, throwing her off the roof after she confronts Urquhart about his actions.
- Mattie Storin does not scream "Daddy" as she falls.
- Urquhart covers up his murder of Mattie Storin by claiming she was an obsessed stalker who was mentally ill and vows to make mental health amongst the young a priority.
- Mattie Storin works for newspaper The Chronicle, per the TV series.
- Urquhart's wife Miranda is changed to Mortima.
- Tim Stamper, though present in the serial, does not appear in the revised version of the novel.
- Urquhart makes asides to the audience in the form of epigraphs at the beginning of each chapter (the original novel has no chapters).

== Reception ==
The first instalment of the TV series coincidentally aired two days before the Conservative Party leadership election. During a time of "disillusionment with politics", the series "caught the nation's mood".

Ian Richardson won the British Academy Television Award for Best Actor in 1991 for his role as Urquhart, and Andrew Davies won an Emmy for outstanding writing in a miniseries.

The series ranked 84th in the British Film Institute list of the 100 Greatest British Television Programmes.

== American adaptation ==
The Urquhart trilogy has been adapted in the United States as House of Cards. The show stars Kevin Spacey as Francis "Frank" Underwood, the Majority Whip of the Democratic caucus in the U.S. House of Representatives, who schemes and murders his way to becoming President of the United States. It is produced by David Fincher and Spacey's Trigger Street Productions, with the initial episodes directed by Fincher.

The series, produced and financed by independent studio Media Rights Capital, was one of Netflix's first forays into original programming. Series one was made available online on 1 February 2013. The series was filmed in Baltimore, Maryland. The first series was critically acclaimed and earned four Golden Globe Nominations, including Best Drama, actor, actress and supporting actor, with Robin Wright winning best actress. It also earned nine Primetime Emmy Award nominations, winning three, and was the first show to earn nominations that was broadcast solely via an internet streaming service.

== In popular culture ==
The drama introduced and popularised the phrase: "You might very well think that; I couldn't possibly comment". It was a non-confirmation confirmative statement, used by Urquhart whenever he could not be seen to agree with a leading statement; with the emphasis on either the "I" or the "possibly", depending on the situation. The phrase was even used in the House of Commons, House of Lords, and Parliamentary Committees following the series. Prince Charles (as he was known at the time) himself said the phrase in response to a provocative question from a journalist in 2014.

A variation on the phrase was written into the TV adaptation of Terry Pratchett's Hogfather for the character Death, as an in-joke based on the fact that he was voiced by Richardson.

A further variation was used by Nicola Murray, a fictional government minister, in the third series finale of The Thick of It.

In the American adaptation, the phrase is used by Frank Underwood in the first episode during his initial meeting with Zoe Barnes, the American counterpart of Mattie Storin.

== See also ==
- List of House of Cards trilogy characters
- Politics in fiction
- List of fictional prime ministers of the United Kingdom
