= Nick Brimble =

British actor (born 1944)

- Born: Nicholas Brimble; 22 July 1944 (age 82); Bristol, England
- Occupation: Actor
- Years active: 1968–present

Nicholas Brimble (born 22 July 1944) is an English actor whose long career has spanned theatre, television, film, and voice work. He is perhaps best known for playing Horst in Crossbow (1987–1989), the monster in Frankenstein Unbound (1990), Little John in Robin Hood: Prince of Thieves (1991) and Jack Chapman in Grantchester (2014–present).

== Early life ==
Brimble was born in Bristol. His father was a schoolteacher who was also a keen amateur actor, an activity in which Nick was involved on occasions as a child. For several summers his father also managed a French/Czech high-wire act, the White Devils, and in July 1961 organised their blindfolded high-wire crossing of Cheddar Gorge. When the act toured Britain, the Brimble family travelled with them. At the end of the 1961 season's tour of Britain, Brimble travelled through France with the White Devils, helping as they set up and performed in towns as they went, and returning for the start of the autumn school term.

He attended Bristol Grammar School. In his first year he played Miranda in a school production of The Tempest. Brimble's parents gave him a season ticket to the Bristol Old Vic, where he saw every play from the age of 11 until he went to university at 18.

He studied Philosophy and English Literature at the University of Sussex from 1962 to 1966. He left with an MA and went on to teach English and Drama at the University of Baghdad. Brimble's stay in Iraq only lasted one year, owing to the political unrest there; he left at the outbreak of the Six-Day War in 1967, driving back to the UK overland in a battered Mini car purchased from British tourists he had met in Baghdad. The following year he taught at a south London comprehensive school, before deciding to try to be an actor.

== Career ==
In 1968 Brimble became Youth Theatre Organiser at the Marlowe Theatre in Canterbury. He administered the TIE (Theatre in Education) company, which toured plays to schools in Kent. He also acted in the plays as well as driving the van and doing whatever else was necessary. At the same time he appeared in small parts for the main Marlowe Theatre Company. In 1970 Brimble and other members of the TIE company formed Actors' Circus, an independent company. The first production was Waiting for Godot at the University of Kent's Gulbenkian Theatre, in which he played Vladimir.

Later that year, Actors' Circus performed at London's Little Theatre Club. Brimble then went on to work at Hull Arts Centre in Richard III with Bob Hoskins, the London Theatre Group in Macbeth with Steven Berkoff, the Palace Theatre, Watford, as well as playing a small part as a villager in the 1971 Hammer film Lust for a Vampire.

From 1971 to 1973 Brimble worked at the Northcott Theatre repertory company in Exeter. He appeared in The Caucasian Chalk Circle, Julius Caesar, The Tempest, Loot, Guys and Dolls, and many other plays. He played Jesus in The Cornish Passion Play.

In 1973 Brimble's television work began with Thomas Hardy's Wessex Tales, playing the part of Willowes in Barbara of the House of Grebe, with Ben Kingsley and Joanna McCallum. He had a semi-regular part in The Sweeney as well as appearing in guest roles in many television productions such as Softly Softly, Z-Cars, The Professionals, Space: 1999, Blake's 7, Danger UXB, and Dempsey and Makepeace.

Brimble's film work during this time included Silver Dream Racer, Sweeney!, Who Dares Wins and Sheena.

In 1989, Roger Corman cast him as the Monster in Frankenstein Unbound with Raul Julia, Bridget Fonda and John Hurt. The following year he played Little John in the film, Robin Hood: Prince of Thieves.

Since then, he has continued to work consistently on British television and in international films, as well as radio drama and voice work.

Other television appearances include The Professionals, To Play the King, The Final Cut, Skallagrigg, Doc Martin, Lock, Stock..., Ivanhoe, The Bill, Emmerdale, The Coroner, Grantchester, and many others.

His later films include A Knight's Tale, Loch Ness, Gone Fishin', and Soulmate.

== Selected filmography ==
- Lust for a Vampire (1971) - First Villager
- The Sweeney (1975-1978, TV Series) - D.C. Gerry Burtonshaw
- Sweeney! (1977) - D.S. Burtonshaw
- The Professionals (1977) - Big Billy
- Yanks (1979) - Merchant Seaman (uncredited)
- S.O.S. Titanic (1979) - Olaus Abelseth
- Silver Dream Racer (1980) - Jack Davis
- The Onedin Line (1980, TV Series) - Avery
- Masada (1981, TV Mini-Series) - Milades
- Who Dares Wins (1982) - Williamson
- The Scarlet Pimpernel (1982, TV Movie) - Bibot
- Jamaica Inn (1983, TV Movie) - Hussar
- Sheena (1984) - Wadman
- Christmas Present (1985)
- Return to Treasure Island (1986, TV Series) - Keelhaul
- Dempsey and Makepeace (1986, TV Series)
- Crossbow (1987-1989, TV Series) - Horst
- Tank Malling (1989) - American
- Frankenstein Unbound (1990) - The Monster
- The Silver Chair (1990) - Giant Porter
- Robin Hood: Prince of Thieves (1991) - Little John
- Year of the Comet (1992) - Jamie
- To Play the King (1993 TV series) - Corder
- The Final Cut (1995 TV series) - Corder
- Loch Ness (1996) - Andy Maclean
- The One That Got Away (1996) - Sgt Vince Phillips
- Ivanhoe (1997, TV Mini-Series) - Reginald Front de Boeuf
- Gone Fishin' (1997) - Dekker Massey
- Fortress 2: Re-Entry (2000) - Max Polk
- Seven Days to Live (2000) - Carl Farrell
- Lock, Stock... (2000) - Uncle Derek
- Five Seconds to Spare (2000) - Marlon
- The Calling (2000) - Police Inspector Oliver Morton
- A Knight's Tale (2001) - Sir Ector
- Gypsy Woman (2001) - Manni
- The Baby Juice Express (2004) - Krakowski
- Control (2004) - Dimi Vertov
- Submerged (2005) - Dr. Adrian Lehder
- Hui Buh: The Goofy Ghost (2006) - Daalor / Adolar
- Emmerdale (2006) - Terence Turner
- Body Armour (2007) - Victor Tolkin
- Too Much Too Young (2007) - Frankie Bridge
- 7 Lives (2011) - Ted
- Soulmate (2013) - Dr Zellaby
- Grantchester (2014–present, TV series) - Jack Chapman

== Video game voice credits ==
Brimble voiced the character of John Watson in the Sherlock Holmes: Crimes & Punishments, and Leontius in Ryse: Son of Rome.
