= To Play the King =

1993 British political thriller television drama

- Based on: To Play the King by Michael Dobbs
- Written by: Andrew Davies
- Directed by: Paul Seed
- Starring: Ian Richardson; Michael Kitchen; Kitty Aldridge; Diane Fletcher; Nick Brimble; Nicholas Farrell
- Music by: Jim Parker
- Country of origin: United Kingdom
- Original language: English
- No. of episodes: 4

Production
- Producer: Ken Riddington
- Running time: 50 minutes

Original release
- Network: BBC
- Release: 21 November – 12 December 1993

Related
- House of Cards; The Final Cut

To Play the King is a 1993 BBC television serial and the second part of the House of Cards trilogy. Directed by Paul Seed, the serial was based on Michael Dobbs' 1992 novel of the same name and adapted for television by Andrew Davies. The opening and closing theme music for the TV series is entitled "Francis Urquhart's March", by composer Jim Parker. The series details the conflict between British Prime Minister Francis Urquhart and a newly crowned king as well as the run-up to the general election.

The book and TV serialisation follow on from the TV version of the first part of the trilogy. To Play the King (and the final part The Final Cut) reflect upon the end of the first series, which differed somewhat from the plot of the original novel.

== Plot ==
The newly crowned King (Michael Kitchen) is displeased with the Conservative government led by Prime Minister Francis Urquhart (Ian Richardson) and becomes involved in politics in a way that Urquhart finds unacceptable for a constitutional monarch. At their first meeting, the King expresses concern about Urquhart's social policies, which he argues have led to greater problems for urban areas. Tensions escalate when Urquhart moves his moderate Environment Secretary to a job in Strasbourg after rejecting his proposals to regenerate inner cities. The King's Assistant Press Secretary, Chloe Carmichael, leaks the outcome of the meeting to the press, which rankles Urquhart.

Fearing the King will weaken his position, Urquhart obtains "regal insurance" from Princess Charlotte, a royal family member. His underling, party chairman Tim Stamper, persuades her to divulge lurid details about the Monarchy to Sir Bruce Bullerby, the editor of the Daily Clarion tabloid, on the condition that the information is published after her death. Urquhart also begins regularly meeting with the King's ex-wife, repeatedly assuring her that he has no intention of disturbing the Monarchy, implying he would support the early accession of her teenaged son as King.

The King and his staff produce a public service announcement implicitly denouncing Urquhart's policies and covertly rally Opposition leaders to join forces against the Prime Minister. Irked by this intransigence, Urquhart calls an early election. His wife, Elizabeth, introduces him to a pollster named Sarah Harding and persuades him to choose her as a political advisor. Urquhart is impressed with Harding's intelligence and starts to favour her over Stamper, who becomes increasingly bitter over his reluctance to promote him to a senior position. Urquhart eventually begins an affair with Harding, which puts a strain on her marriage. Through all this, he continues to be haunted by his murder of Mattie Storin; unbeknownst to him, someone possesses Mattie's tape recording of her own death. Corder, Urquhart's bodyguard and security advisor, puts the King and other enemies under surveillance.

After a brief abduction by some homeless thugs, Harding is told to "ask 'im about Mattie Storin". Despite her feelings for Urquhart, Harding begins to question his version of events about the tragedy. She meets John Krajewski, a former colleague of Mattie's who is now a paranoid freelance journalist. Corder and his staff execute Krajewski and blame it on Irish republican terrorists. Meanwhile, Urquhart threatens the King with Charlotte's memoirs, saying that he will be forced to publish them if the King continues publicly to oppose him. The King, however, refuses to be blackmailed. Urquhart engages in secret meetings with the King's ex-wife, who urges him not to back down. He also blackmails Bullerby into publishing Charlotte's memoirs in the Daily Clarion, threatening to release images of his sexual relationship with the princess.

While the royal scandal succeeds in hurting the King's popularity, the polls reverse when Conservative MP John Staines is arrested for sex with a minor. A furious Urquhart blames Stamper for the fallout, having put Staines in the public arena moments before his arrest. David Mycroft, the King's closeted advisor and Chief of Staff at Buckingham Palace, has recently separated from his wife and has entered into a romantic relationship with another man. Fearing his sexual orientation may damage the King's standing as well as having seen Staines in a gay bar with an underage boy before the arrest, Mycroft ultimately decides to come out to the King's press corps and announces his resignation.

The deadly explosion of a tower block, as a result of a tenant's tapping into the gas main, puts the King's arguments about social problems back into the public domain. Urquhart announces his intention of having unemployed youth from the estates conscripted into the Armed Forces, re-enacting a form of peacetime national service. The King organises a bus tour visiting disadvantaged estates to show his concern, refusing to include a security detail. Urquhart arranges for Corder to have the King abducted by thugs during his tour of an estate in Manchester. The Parachute Regiment, secretly shadowing the King's tour on Urquhart's orders, rescues him from possible harm. The King is seen as foolish for his negligence in the matter of security, and Urquhart seems like a hero for having protected him.

Meanwhile, Corder discovers that Stamper has passed information on Mattie's murder to Harding as insurance. With urging from Elizabeth, Urquhart orders Corder to assassinate them. The Conservatives subsequently win the general election with a 22-seat overall majority. With his policies vindicated by the electorate, despite the King's public opposition, Urquhart demands his abdication. Harding's car explodes when she is en route to meet Chloe, while Stamper's car explodes outside New Scotland Yard. The media interpret the car bombings as Provisional IRA attacks.

The end credits of the final episode roll with images of the crowning of the new teenaged King, showing that Urquhart had succeeded in obtaining the abdication of the previous King. At the end of the credits, Urquhart smirks at the camera and triumphantly says, "God Save the King", ending the series.

== Breaking the fourth wall ==
As in House of Cards, Urquhart occasionally speaks directly to the audience. He takes the viewer into his confidence, and at the end of the series, as at the end of the first, he challenges the viewer to condemn him.

== Novel differences ==
In the novel, but not in the television series:

- The storyline follows on directly from those of House of Cards, in that Urquhart has just taken over as Leader of the Conservative Party. (In the television series Urquhart is well-established as prime minister.)
- Tim Stamper takes over as Party Chairman at the beginning of the novel rather than as the plot unfolds as it is Urquhart's plan to call a snap election to increase his party's parliamentary majority.
- After Urquhart stops his business interests expanding, Ben Landless becomes an opponent of Urquhart and an ally of the king.
- Chloe Carmichael was created for the television adaptation.
- Sarah Harding does not appear. Her character is represented by Sally Quinn, an American who also feeds information about Urquhart to Ben Landless.
- Tim Stamper does not betray Urquhart and therefore is not murdered.
- Mattie Storin's and Roger O'Neill's murders are not directly mentioned nor used as a plot device.
- It is implied that Urquhart is responsible for his and his wife's childlessness. Indeed, their relationship is less close than in the television series. When Landless threatens to expose Elizabeth's affair, Francis implies that he will divorce her to gain sympathy and to cling to power.
- The King willingly abdicates ahead of the general election, indicating that he will stand against Urquhart. In fact, he insists on his abdication being handled before Urquhart can call the election. Rather than feeling confident that the King has been politically neutered, Urquhart is left feeling that the ground is slipping beneath him.

In 2013, the novel was reissued along with the rest of the trilogy, to coincide with the launch of the American version of House of Cards, with Dobbs having rewritten portions of the novel in order to restore continuity between the three novels and to bring it more in line with the mini-series. Changes made include:

- The beginning and ending of the novel now reflect the mini-series, though with some changes. Urquhart has been prime minister for nearly two years while the King has only just assumed the throne following the death of the Queen at the start of the revised novel. He only decides to go after the King at the persuasion of his wife, who notices that Urquhart had grown bored with power and needed a new enemy to thwart.
- The ending has the King being forced to abdicate, following Urquhart's electoral success, after Urquhart informs him that he plans on using all of the resources at his disposal to destroy the Royal Family if he does not abdicate the throne.
- Furthermore, there is an additional scene with the King's teenage son and Urquhart, after his father's abdication, where the newly crowned King informs Urquhart that "nothing lasts forever", in relations to Urquhart's own power and position as prime minister. This leads to the final chapter of the revised novel, where Urquhart ponders his legacy and whether or not he would be remembered as a bully who forced the King of England to abdicate.
- Corder and Tim Stamper are given additional page time, with their past with Urquhart revealed.
- Corder's characteristics are changed to make him more in line with Edward Meechum, his counterpart character in the US adaptation of the show. In particular, it is stated that his loyalty to Urquhart is due to Urquhart vouching for him after an unstated incident early on in his tenure with the Urquharts, where the Chief Whip saved his job. Similarly, Stamper's betrayal and death from the TV series is not imported into the revised novel.
- Mattie Storin's death is mentioned by several minor journalist characters, with it implied that many feel Urquhart did indeed kill her but that due to his power and reach, no one dare publicly accuse him.
