= The Final Cut (TV serial) =

1995 BBC television serial

- Based on: The Final Cut by Michael Dobbs
- Written by: Andrew Davies
- Directed by: Mike Vardy
- Starring: Ian Richardson; Diane Fletcher; Nick Brimble
- Theme music composer: Jim Parker
- Country of origin: United Kingdom
- Original language: English
- No. of episodes: 4

Production
- Producer: Ken Riddington
- Running time: 50 minutes

Original release
- Network: BBC
- Release: 5 November – 26 November 1995

Related
- House of Cards; To Play the King

The Final Cut is a 1995 BBC television serial, the third part of the House of Cards trilogy. Directed by Mike Vardy, the serial, based on Michael Dobbs's 1994 novel of the same name, was adapted for television by Andrew Davies. It details the conclusion of Francis Urquhart's reign as Prime Minister of the United Kingdom.

== Plot ==
The serial opens with Prime Minister Francis Urquhart shooting his gun dog, now too old to perform her duties – a scene which establishes the theme of the ending of a career. Shortly afterwards, Urquhart attends the fictional state funeral of Margaret Thatcher. (Note: Margaret Thatcher's death, in the real world, did not happen until 2013, about 18 years after the series aired; she was also accorded a "ceremonial funeral" instead of a state funeral, honouring both her wishes and that of her family.) He publicly praises Thatcher as his mentor, but privately begrudges her record as the longest-serving prime minister in recent history, (Note: The serial refers to Thatcher as Britain's longest-serving Prime Minister, when she was actually the seventh-longest serving. The novel does not contain this mistake, as it accurately refers to Thatcher as the longest-serving post-war Prime Minister.) a record that Urquhart himself is soon to surpass.

To "leave my mark on the world", Urquhart champions a treaty resolving the Cyprus dispute while secretly working to bring offshore oil deposits under the control of the Turkish authorities on the island so that a Turkish-British consortium will have the drilling rights; an executive of the consortium has promised to provide for Urquhart's retirement fund in return. Urquhart also has a personal connection to Cyprus: as a nineteen-year-old British Army lieutenant serving there in 1956, he killed two young EOKA guerrillas while trying to get information from them. Urquhart has frequent nightmares and flashbacks of this event, and also of the murders of Mattie Storin and others, shown in the previous series.

On a motorway near London, Urquhart's limousine is forced off the road by a car containing three drunken louts. The attackers threaten Urquhart's party with baseball bats but are shot dead by security staff as they approach. Urquhart himself sustains minor head injuries in the collision, but his life is not endangered. When Elizabeth arrives at hospital, he is delirious and confuses the incident on the motorway with the incident in Cyprus. Tom Makepeace, Urquhart's Foreign Secretary and Deputy Prime Minister, chairs a cabinet meeting while Urquhart is in hospital; Urquhart considers Makepeace – the actual negotiator of the Cyprus treaty – as a potential challenger, although he does not take the threat very seriously, considering him "not a fighter" but "a sentimental dreamer".

The brother of the murdered Greek Cypriot guerrillas, who witnessed their deaths, lives in London and recognises Urquhart as the soldier who killed them. He asks his daughter Maria to investigate while secretly considering taking vengeance on Urquhart. Maria's search of government records finds a report on the incident written by Urquhart, but his name is redacted. Upon being approached by Maria, Urquhart arranges for documents revealing his involvement to be excluded from a coincidental declassification of British records relating to Cyprus; he confides the truth to Elizabeth. Meanwhile, Urquhart appoints ambitious backbencher Claire Carlsen as his Parliamentary Private Secretary. Claire also happens to be Makepeace's lover. She subsequently plays the two men against each other.

Encouraged by Claire, Urquhart enrages Makepeace by making a speech in the House of Commons suggesting that Britain should not adopt the European currency, but that Europe should instead adopt English as its official language. When Urquhart seeks to appoint Makepeace to the Department of Education in a cabinet reshuffle, Makepeace resigns from the government, crosses the floor and emerges as the prime minister's main adversary in Parliament. He also challenges Urquhart for the leadership of the Conservative Party and forces him into a second ballot. Meanwhile, Claire advises Maria to take her case to Makepeace, who repeatedly raises the cover-up in parliament. At Makepeace's suggestion, Claire purloins the unedited report on the Cyprus killings from the secret government archive where it is stored. However, Urquhart's bodyguard, Corder – informed by the archive clerk – seizes the document from her, without realizing that she had already made copies.

Makepeace's leadership challenge has attracted enough support to convince Urquhart that his position is in jeopardy. He decides to leak information regarding the oil deposits in order to stir up a conflict in Cyprus as "our Falklands" to unite Britain under his leadership. When Greek nationalists kidnap a British diplomat and the Greek Cypriot President, Urquhart deploys British troops to retrieve them. Though the troops successfully rescue the hostages, the intervention later results in the death of civilians, including young schoolgirls, largely because of Urquhart's drastic orders. Urquhart's support plummets, and when he proves unwilling to accept responsibility or sympathy over the deaths, many MPs openly call on him to resign. While Urquhart appears defiant, his wife is worried, and she consults Corder for advice on how to save him. Corder advises "drastic measures" and informs her that he has sent a copy of Mattie Storin's tape, revealing Urquhart's role in her death, to Makepeace.

Makepeace confronts Urquhart and announces that he will publish the tape, but not before Urquhart has achieved his aim of surpassing Thatcher's record. After this, Urquhart again meets Maria. The incriminating Cyprus report has been sent to Maria's father anonymously and Maria vows to publish it. After this, Urquhart despairs, but Elizabeth consoles him and hints at a ploy by Corder. At the unveiling of Thatcher's memorial, on the day when Urquhart surpasses her record, Maria's father approaches Urquhart with a pistol – but before he can shoot a sniper (working for Corder) shoots Urquhart and then him. Elizabeth and Corder had arranged for Urquhart's assassination as the only way to preserve his reputation (and the retirement fund). Urquhart dies in his wife's arms, while Corder offers his services to Makepeace, the apparent successor.

== Cast ==
- Ian Richardson as Francis Urquhart, Prime Minister of the United Kingdom
- Diane Fletcher as Elizabeth Urquhart
- Isla Blair as Claire Carlsen MP, Parliamentary Private Secretary
- Paul Freeman as Tom Makepeace, Deputy Prime Minister, Foreign Secretary and later backbencher on the opposition side
- Nickolas Grace as Geoffrey Booza-Pitt, Chancellor of the Duchy of Lancaster and later Foreign Secretary
- Nick Brimble as Corder, Urquhart's bodyguard
- Yolanda Vazquez as Maria Passolides
- Kevork Malikyan as Nures
- Julian Fellowes as Sir Henry Ponsonby
- John Rowe as Sir Clive Watling
- Miles Richardson as Major Jardine
- Michael Fabricant in a cameo role

== Production ==
- The opening scenes containing Margaret Thatcher's funeral proved controversial and generated a great deal of adverse commentary in newspapers, as it was felt to be inappropriate to show the funeral of a real person who was still alive. It also led to Michael Dobbs demanding that his name be removed from the credits.
- The episode length was reduced from 1 hour to 50 minutes.

== Novel differences ==
In the novel, but not in the television series:

- Urquhart does not kill Georgios and Euripides Pasolides in a lone operation but, as an officer, is responsible for their deaths.
- Urquhart successfully thwarts the attempt to build a statue in honour of Margaret Thatcher. (Its erection is a theme—of political mortality—running through the television series.)
- Makepeace does not openly challenge Urquhart for the leadership of their party but leads a popular movement against the Prime Minister.
- Urquhart faces losing a general election and he is urged to resign by his Cabinet Ministers to keep his undefeated record.
- Mattie Storin's murder is not mentioned and the information is not revealed to Makepeace.
- Urquhart is not suspected as the murderer of Georgios and Euripides Pasolides until all is revealed at the end.
- Urquhart is not assassinated on Corder's orders, but allows the brother of the men he killed in Cyprus to shoot him, making himself a martyr in the process.
- Makepeace does not succeed Urquhart but is tarred by association with Urquhart's assassin as planned.
- It is unclear whether Urquhart beats Margaret Thatcher's record in office as the longest-serving post-war prime minister.
