= Francis Urquhart =

Fictional prime minister of the United Kingdom in House of Cards

- House of Cards character
- First appearance: House of Cards
- Last appearance: The Final Cut
- Created by: Michael Dobbs
- Portrayed by: Ian Richardson

In-universe information
- Alias: Francis Ewan Urquhart
- Occupation: Chief Whip; Parliamentary Secretary to the Treasury (Series 1); Prime Minister of the United Kingdom of Great Britain and Northern Ireland (1992–2003) (Series 2 – Series 3)
- Family: Alaister Urquhart (brother; deceased); William Urquhart (brother)
- Spouse: Elizabeth Urquhart
- Significant other: Mattie Storin; Sarah Harding
- Nationality: British
- Political affiliation: Conservative

Francis Ewan Urquhart is a fictional character who is the villain protagonist of the British political thriller television serial House of Cards (1990) and its sequel serials, To Play the King (1993) and The Final Cut (1995). He is portrayed by Ian Richardson. The series was co-written by Michael Dobbs and adapted from his eponymous novel. Produced by the BBC, the 4 episodes of House of Cards were broadcast in the days preceding and following Margaret Thatcher’s resignation as Prime Minister of the United Kingdom in 1990. Urquhart is a member of the Conservative Party, and is known to be a ruthless, Machiavellian politician who rises from Chief Whip of the Conservative Party to the office of prime minister through much treachery, deception, and murder. His wife, Elizabeth Urquhart, often persuades him to exploit a given situation to his advantage.

Urquhart's family has roots in the Scottish aristocracy. He served in the British Army in Cyprus for three years. After resigning his commission, Urquhart studies at the University of Oxford. Turning to politics later, Urquhart joined the Conservative Party and became the MP for the constituency of New Forest in 1974. He served in several ministerial positions before becoming Chief Whip in 1987. Some of Urquhart's dialogue throughout the series is presented in a direct address to the viewer, a narrative technique that breaks the fourth wall. These narrative asides are an invention of the television adaptation, as the novel uses third-person narration only.

Throughout the series he manipulates and destroys several people, including those he calls friends, for his own ends. He is depicted as being willing to go to any lengths, even personally committing murder, to see that his intricate schemes pay off. During the first series, he is the chief whip, before achieving his ambitious goal, becoming prime minister in the season finale. The follow-up serials, To Play the King (1993) and The Final Cut (1995), focus on Urquhart's premiership, as he refuses to relinquish his position until he has beaten Thatcher's record as the longest-serving post-war prime minister.

Urquhart is characterised by his catchphrase, "You might very well think that; I couldn't possibly comment", or a variation thereon, as a plausibly deniable way of agreeing with people and/or leaking information. The catchphrase has been referenced by real-world politicians in the House of Commons on many occasions, having entered the national political parlance.

Urquhart's character was adapted by Beau Willimon and Dobbs into the character Frank Underwood, portrayed by Kevin Spacey, the villainous protagonist of the American adaptation of House of Cards.

== Development and reception ==
Michael Dobbs stated that the inspiration behind Urquhart came during a drinking session at a swimming pool after a tense encounter with Margaret Thatcher, deliberately creating a character moulded around the initials "FU". Ian Richardson was offered the role of Urquhart for the BBC TV adaptation of House of Cards in 1990, which he immediately accepted, noting:

From the moment I read the first scripts, I felt that not only was it the biggest acting opportunity to come my way since my Shakespeare days, but probably was going to be something rather special on the box.

Richardson based his portrayal of the character on a representative of the British Council whom he met whilst touring with the Royal Shakespeare Company in Japan. While acknowledging that playing Urquhart brought him immediate public recognition, Richardson stated that as a Scottish Presbyterian, he found the character's Machiavellian deviousness and sex appeal both "really rather revolting". Nevertheless, despite finding him "an irritating bugger", Richardson found Urquhart "a joy to play". Richardson received positive reviews for his portrayal of Urquhart, and won a BAFTA award for his performance.

The character also took inspiration from contemporary Conservative politicians, including the fearsome Conservative Party whip Tristan Garel-Jones.

Howard Rosenberg of the Los Angeles Times praised Urquhart as making "Richard Nixon look like a guileless wimp."

== Depiction ==
=== Personality and background ===
Urquhart is portrayed as having few other interests outside politics, though he is an avid reader of Italian Renaissance poetry and Elizabethan/Jacobean drama, with John Webster and Cyril Tourneur being among his favorite authors. He frequently quotes William Shakespeare, particularly Macbeth.

The novels provide him with a backstory: Urquhart was born in 1936, the youngest of the Earl of Bruichladdich's three sons. His older brother, Alaister, was killed in the Second World War, while the middle brother, William, worked for the family estate and occasionally sat in the House of Lords. The first novel reveals that his father committed suicide, and that his mother disowned him after he decided to go into politics rather than maintain the family estate.

Urquhart was educated at Fettes (although he often wears an Old Etonian tie in the BBC adaptation) where, although not noted for brilliance, he was recognised for his diligence and industriousness. He joined the British Army at age 18, and spent three years in Cyprus, where he was commended for bravery in his capture and interrogation of EOKA terrorists. Urquhart resigned his commission after a colleague was court-martialed for accidentally killing a suspect, and took up a deferred place at the University of Oxford reading History, where he narrowly missed getting a First. He later taught Renaissance Italian History at the university, becoming an authority on the Medici and Machiavelli. He married Elizabeth McCullough, the eldest daughter of a whisky magnate named William McCullough, in 1960. By the time of House of Cards, Urquhart has long abandoned academia in favour of politics, having steadily risen to the position of Chief Whip.

=== Politics ===
Urqhuart lives in Lyndhurst, Hampshire and represents the county constituency of New Forest for the Conservative Party. He is right-wing and his policies include abolishing the Arts Council, outlawing vagrancy, reintroducing conscription and banning pensioners from National Health Service treatment unless they have paid for Age Insurance. He describes himself to his wife, Elizabeth, as "a plain, no-nonsense, old-fashioned Tory." In To Play the King, the unnamed King of the United Kingdom accuses Urquhart of practically abandoning Scotland and Wales. Urquhart notes that he detests the welfare state and contemporary youth culture.

Urquhart's foreign policy is Anglocentric; he thinks that Britain has more to teach the world, and Europe in particular, than the other way around. He would like to see the rest of the European Union speaking English – a position that would then completely alienate Foreign Secretary Tom Makepeace. Besides this, his strong belief in discipline and the rule of law shapes his foreign policy in Cyprus, where he authorises the use of force against schoolgirls who are blocking military vehicles.

== Other incarnations ==
In the American remake of the House of Cards trilogy, Urquhart's place is filled by Francis "Frank" Underwood (Kevin Spacey), a Democratic representative from South Carolina's 5th district and House Majority Whip, who schemes and murders his way to becoming President of the United States. According to series producer Beau Willimon, the change in last name stemmed from the "Dickensian" feeling and "more legitimately American" sounding resonance of the name 'Underwood'.

Whereas Urquhart is an aristocrat by birth, Underwood is a self-made man, having been born into a poor Southern family with an alcoholic father. Urquhart was one of television's first antiheroes, whereas Underwood follows the more recent rash of antiheroes that includes Tony Soprano of The Sopranos, Walter White of Breaking Bad, and Dexter Morgan of Dexter. However, unlike most other antiheroes, Underwood is not forced into immorality either by circumstance (White), birth (Soprano) or nature (Morgan). In his review of Season 2, Slant Magazine's Alan Jones writes that Underwood is evil by choice.

Although Underwood is based on the BBC show's lead character, in interviews during the writing and filming of season 2, Willimon said that he used Lyndon B. Johnson as a source of themes and issues addressed in House of Cards. Unlike the right wing Urquhart, who leads the Conservative Party, Underwood is a member of the Democratic Party, but cares little for ideology in favor of "ruthless pragmatism" in furthering his own political influence and power.
