= Ian Richardson =

Scottish actor (1934–2007)

Ian Richardson CBE
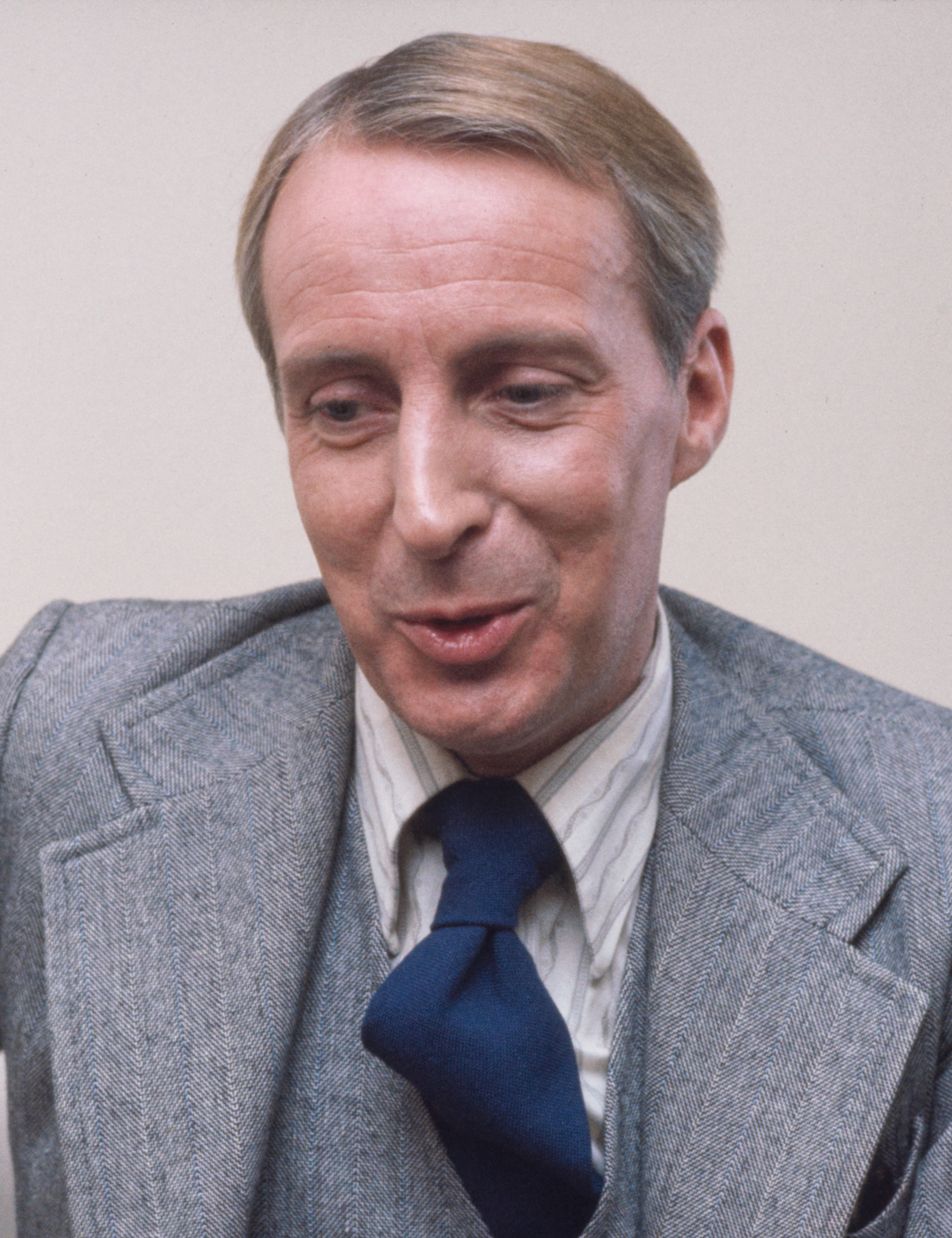
- Richardson circa 1976
- Born: Ian William Richardson; 7 April 1934; Edinburgh, Scotland
- Died: 9 February 2007 (aged 72); London, England
- Education: Royal Scottish Academy of Music and Drama
- Occupation: Actor
- Years active: 1954–2007
- Spouse: Maroussia Frank (m. 1961)
- Children: 2, including Miles Richardson

Ian William Richardson CBE (7 April 1934 – 9 February 2007) was a Scottish actor. He is best known for his portrayal of Conservative politician Francis Urquhart in the BBC Television trilogy House of Cards (1990–1995), as well as Bill Haydon in Tinker Tailor Soldier Spy (1979). His other notable screen work included a portrayal of Sherlock Holmes in the television films The Sign of Four and The Hound of the Baskervilles (both 1983), as well as significant roles in Brazil (1985), M. Butterfly (1993), and Dark City (1998).

Richardson was also a leading stage actor, well known for his Shakespearean works as well as his portrayal of Jean-Paul Marat in the Broadway production of Marat/Sade.

== Early life ==
Richardson was born in Edinburgh, the only son and eldest of three children of John Richardson (1909–1990), a manager at the McVitie & Price factory (where he and his wife met, and, according to his son, where John invented the Jaffa cake), and Margaret ("Peggy") Pollock (1910–1988), née Drummond. He was educated in the city, at Balgreen Primary School, Tynecastle High School and George Heriot's School.

Richardson first appeared on stage at the age of 14, in an amateur production of Charles Dickens' A Tale of Two Cities. The director encouraged his talent but warned that he would need to lose his Scottish accent to progress as an actor. His mother arranged elocution lessons, and he became a stage manager with the semi-professional Edinburgh People's Theatre.

After National Service in the Army, part of which he spent as an announcer and drama director with the British Forces Broadcasting Service, Richardson obtained a place at the College of Dramatic Arts in Glasgow. After a period at the Old Rep, also known as the Birmingham Repertory Theatre, he appeared with the Royal Shakespeare Company (RSC), of which he was a founding member, from 1960 to 1975.

== Stage work ==
Although he later gained his highest profile in film and television work such as House of Cards (1990), Richardson was primarily a classical stage actor. His first engagement after training was with Birmingham Repertory Theatre, where his performance of Hamlet led to an offer of a place with the Royal Shakespeare Company. He was a versatile member of the company for more than 15 years, playing villainy, comedy and tragedy to equal effect. He was The Herald in Peter Brook's production of Marat/Sade in London in 1964. In the New York City transfer he took the lead role of Jean-Paul Marat, and became the first actor to appear nude on the Broadway stage, a performance he repeated for the 1967 film Marat/Sade.

In 1972, Richardson appeared in the musical Trelawny, with which the Bristol Old Vic reopened after its refurbishment. It proved a great success, transferring to London, first to the Sadler's Wells Theatre and later to the Prince of Wales Theatre. Richardson played the hero, Tom Wrench, a small-part player who wants to write about "real people". He had a song, "Walking On", lamenting his lack of scope in the company, in which he explains that as a "walking gentleman" he will be forever "walking on", whilst Rose Trelawney will go on to be a star.

While at the RSC, Richardson played leading roles in many productions for director John Barton. These included the title role in Coriolanus (1967), Cassius in Julius Caesar (1968), Angelo in Measure for Measure (1970) and Iachimo in Cymbeline. Work for other directors at Stratford included the title role in Pericles (1969), directed by Terry Hands; the title role in Richard III (1975), directed by Barry Kyle; and Berowne in David Jones's production of Love's Labour's Lost (1973). Richardson cited the role of Berowne as one of his all-time favourite parts. In 1974, Richardson's Richard II, alternating the parts of the king and Bolingbroke with Richard Pasco, and repeated in New York and London in the following year, was hugely celebrated.

In 1969, Richardson had a significant Shakespearean cameo role in a brief performance as Hamlet in the gravedigger scene as part of episode six, "Protest and Communication", of Kenneth Clark's Civilisation television series. This was performed at Kirby Hall in Northamptonshire with Patrick Stewart as Horatio and Ronald Lacey as the gravedigger.

On leaving the RSC, Richardson played Professor Henry Higgins in the 20th anniversary Broadway revival of My Fair Lady (1976) and received the Drama Desk Award for Outstanding Actor in a Musical and a nomination for the Tony Award for Best Actor in a Musical. He also appeared on Broadway as onstage narrator in the original production of Edward Albee's play Lolita (1981), an adaptation of Vladimir Nabokov's book that was not critically well received.

In 1995, Richardson played The Miser at Chichester. In 1997, he played The Magistrate, also at Chichester, which transferred to the Savoy Theatre.

In 2002, Richardson joined Derek Jacobi, Donald Sinden and Diana Rigg in an international tour of The Hollow Crown, and this was repeated the following year with Janet Suzman in the female roles. A Canadian tour substituted Alan Howard for Jacobi and Vanessa Redgrave for Suzman. He also appeared in The Creeper by Pauline Macaulay at the Playhouse Theatre in London, and on tour. His last stage appearance was in 2006 as Sir Epicure Mammon in The Alchemist at the National Theatre in London.

== Films and television ==
=== Early career ===
In 1963, Richardson played Le Beau in Michael Elliott's television production of As You Like It, playing alongside Vanessa Redgrave. In 1964, he played Antipholus of Ephesus in The Comedy of Errors as part of the Festival television series. In 1966, he played Jean-Paul Marat in the Royal Shakespeare Company production of Peter Weiss' Marat/Sade, directed by Peter Brook.

In 1967, Richardson played The Constable in A Man Takes a Drink as part of a television series entitled The Revenue Men. In 1968, he played Bertram in John Barton's television version of All's Well That Ends Well, and played Oberon in the Peter Hall film of A Midsummer Night's Dream. In 1969, he took part in the television production of John Mortimer's A Voyage Round My Father in Plays of Today and appeared in the television adaptation of The Canterbury Tales (1969).

Richardson played one musical role on film, the Priest in Man of La Mancha, the 1972 screen version of the Broadway musical. Also in 1972, he played Anthony Beavis in the television series Eyeless in Gaza.

Richardson also appeared in BBC radio plays, notably in 'The House on the Strand' by Daphne du Maurier, in 1973.

In a 1974 episode of CBS's Camera Three about the RSC production of Richard II then running at the Brooklyn Academy of Music, Richardson and Richard Pasco alternated playing Bolingbroke and Richard in excerpts from some of the play's key scenes. In 1978, Richardson played Robespierre in the BBC's Play of the Month production of Danton's Death. In 1979, he played Field Marshal Sir Bernard Montgomery in the TV miniseries Ike.

Richardson's first major television role was his appearance as Bill Haydon ("Tailor") in the BBC adaptation of Tinker Tailor Soldier Spy (1979). He again played the part of Field Marshal Montgomery in Churchill and the Generals in 1979, a BBC television videotaped play concerning the relationship between Winston Churchill and generals of the Allied forces between 1940 and 1945.

In the 1980s, Richardson became well known as Major Neuheim in the award-winning Private Schulz and as Sir Godber Evans in Channel 4's adaptation of Porterhouse Blue. In 1983, Richardson performed the role of Sherlock Holmes for two of six planned television movies, The Sign of Four and The Hound of the Baskervilles, which were both critically acclaimed. He appeared in Brazil (1985) and played Jawaharlal Nehru in the television serial, Lord Mountbatten: The Last Viceroy (1986). He portrayed Anthony Blunt, the Soviet spy and Surveyor of The King's Pictures in the BBC film Blunt: the Fourth Man (1986) opposite Anthony Hopkins as Guy Burgess.

In 1988, Richardson played Edward Spencer, the eccentric and oblivious English landowner in 1920s Ireland in Troubles, from J. G. Farrell's award-winning novel. In 1987, he played a variation on this role, when he portrayed the Bishop of Motopo in the non-musical television film Monsignor Quixote, based on Graham Greene's modernised take on Don Quixote. He played Sir Nigel Irvine in John Mackenzie's adaptation of Frederick Forsyth's novel The Fourth Protocol (1987).

Richardson also appeared in commercials for Grey Poupon Dijon mustard in the United States in his role as Prime Minister Francis Urquhart, opposite Paul Eddington as Prime Minister Jim Hacker.

=== Later career ===
Richardson's most acclaimed television role was as Machiavellian politician Francis Urquhart in the BBC adaptation of Michael Dobbs's House of Cards trilogy. He won the BAFTA Best Television Actor Award for his portrayal in the first series of House of Cards (1990), and was nominated for both of the sequels To Play the King (1993) and The Final Cut (1995).

In 1989, Richardson also starred in a TV production of The Winslow Boy with Emma Thompson and Gordon Jackson. He received another BAFTA nomination for his role as Falkland Islands governor Sir Rex Hunt in the film An Ungentlemanly Act (1992), and played corrupt politician Michael Spearpoint, British Director of the European Economic Community, in the satirical series The Gravy Train and The Gravy Train Goes East. He narrated the BBC docudrama A Royal Scandal (1996).

Richardson's other roles in this period include Polonius in Rosencrantz & Guildenstern Are Dead (1990), Sir Mason Harwood in Year of the Comet (1992), the French ambassador in M. Butterfly (1993), Martin Landau's butler in B*A*P*S (1997), a malevolent alien in Dark City (1998), The Kralahome in The King and I (1999), Cruella de Vil's Barrister, Mr. Torte QC, in the live-action film 102 Dalmatians (2000), and a corrupt aristocrat in From Hell (2001).

In 1999, Richardson became known to a young audience as the main character Stephen Tyler in both series of the family drama The Magician's House (1999–2000). Following this he played Lord Groan in the major BBC production Gormenghast (2000), and later that year he starred in the BBC production Murder Rooms: The Dark Beginnings of Sherlock Holmes (2000–2001) (screened in PBS's Mystery! series in the US), playing Arthur Conan Doyle's mentor, Dr. Joseph Bell, a role he welcomed as an opportunity to play a character from his native Edinburgh. He once more returned to fantasy in the recurring role of the villainous Canon Black in the short-lived BBC cult series Strange (2003).

In 2005, Richardson took on the role of the Lord Chancellor in the television drama Bleak House. He also played the Judge in the family-based film, The Adventures of Greyfriars Bobby (2005). Additionally, in that year, he appeared in ITV's main Christmas drama The Booze Cruise 2, playing Marcus Foster, a slimy upper class businessman forced to spend time with "the lower classes". He returned to this role for a sequel the following Easter.

In June 2006, Richardson was made an honorary Doctor of the University of Stirling. The honour was conferred on him by the university's Chancellor, fellow actor Dame Diana Rigg.

In December 2006, Richardson starred in Sky One's two-part adaptation of the Terry Pratchett novel Hogfather (1997). He voiced the main character of the novel, Death, who steps in to take over the role of the Father Christmas-like Hogfather. The DVD of that miniseries, released shortly after his death, opens with a dedication to his memory.

Richardson's final film appearance was as Judge Langlois in Becoming Jane (2007), released shortly after his death.

During the last 15 years of his life, Richardson appeared five times on television acting opposite his son Miles Richardson, though this was usually with one or the other in a minor role.

== Death ==
Richardson died in his sleep of a heart attack on the morning of 9 February 2007, aged 72. He was survived by his wife, Maroussia Frank, an actress, and two sons, one of whom, Miles, is an actor. Richardson's body was cremated. His ashes were placed in the foundation of the auditorium of the Royal Shakespeare Theatre in Stratford during renovations in 2008.

== Tributes ==
Helen Mirren dedicated her 2006 Best Actress BAFTA award for her portrayal of Queen Elizabeth II in the film The Queen to Richardson. In her acceptance speech she said that without his support early in her career, she might not have been so successful, before breaking down and leaving the stage. Other tributes and reminiscences by Richardson's colleagues are offered in a memoir by Sharon Mail, We Could Possibly Comment: Ian Richardson Remembered (2009).

== Honours ==
Richardson was appointed Commander of the Order of the British Empire (CBE) in the 1989 New Year Honours.

== Awards ==
| Year | Nominated work | Award | Category | Result |
|---|---|---|---|---|
| 1976 | My Fair Lady | Drama Desk Award | Outstanding Actor in a Musical | Won |
| 1976 | My Fair Lady | Tony Award | Best Actor in a Musical | Nominated |
| 1991 | House of Cards | BAFTA TV Award | Best Actor | Won |
| 1993 | An Ungentlemanly Act | BAFTA TV Award | Best Actor | Nominated |
| 1994 | To Play the King | BAFTA TV Award | Best Actor | Nominated |
| 1996 | The Final Cut | BAFTA TV Award | Best Actor | Nominated |

== Selected filmography ==
- Marat/Sade (1967) – Jean-Paul Marat
- A Midsummer Night's Dream (1968) – Oberon
- The Darwin Adventure (1972) – Capt. Fitzroy
- Man of La Mancha (1972) – The Padre
- Gawain and the Green Knight (1973) – Narrator (uncredited)
- Tinker Tailor Soldier Spy (1979) – Bill Haydon
- Charlie Muffin (1979) – Cuthbertson
- Gauguin the Savage (1980) – Degas
- Private Schulz (1981) - Major Neuheim
- The Hound of the Baskervilles (1983) – Sherlock Holmes
- The Sign of Four (1983) – Sherlock Holmes
- Brazil (1985) – Mr. Warrenn
- Whoops Apocalypse (1986) – Rear Admiral Bendish
- The Fourth Protocol (1987) – Sir Nigel Irvine
- Cry Freedom (1987) – State Prosecutor
- Porterhouse Blue (1987) - Sir Godber Evans
- Burning Secret (1988) – Edmund's father
- Twist of Fate (1989) – Doctor Schlossberg
- King of the Wind (1990) – Bey of Tunis
- Rosencrantz & Guildenstern Are Dead (1990) – Polonius
- Year of the Comet (1992) – Sir Mason Harwood
- Foreign Affairs (1993) – Edwin
- M. Butterfly (1993) – Ambassador Toulon
- Dirty Weekend (1993) – Nimrod
- Words Upon the Window Pane (1994) – Dr. Trench
- Savage Play (1995) – Count
- Catherine the Great (1995) – Vorontsov
- The Treasure Seekers (1996) – Haig
- B*A*P*S (1997) – Manley
- The Fifth Province (1997) – Dr. Drudy
- Incognito (1997) – Turley (prosecutor)
- Dark City (1998) – Mr Book
- Alice through the Looking Glass (1998) – Wasp
- The King and I (1999) – The Kralahome (voice)
- 102 Dalmatians (2000) – Mr. Torte
- From Hell (2001) – Sir Charles Warren
- Joyeux Noël (2005) – L'évêque anglais
- The Adventures of Greyfriars Bobby (2005) – Judge
- Désaccord parfait (2006) – Lord Evelyn Gaylord
- Becoming Jane (2007) – Judge Langlois (final film role)

== See also ==
- List of people from Edinburgh
- List of Scottish actors
