= List of fictional politicians =

This is a list of political officeholders from works of fiction. It includes links to standalone lists of fictional U.S. presidents, U.S. vice presidents, U.S. presidential candidates, British prime ministers, British monarchs, and British politicians.

== Mayors ==
- Unnamed Mayor (Michael Murphy) of Gotham City – Batman Returns
- The Mayor – Halloweentown, The Nightmare Before Christmas
- The Mayor (James Gandolfini) – New York City, The Taking of Pelham 123 (2009 Remake)
- The Mayor (Lionel Atwill) – Vasaria, Frankenstein Meets the Wolf Man
- The Mayor (Tom Kenny) - Townsville, The Powerpuff Girls
- District 11 Mayor (Afemo Omilami), District 11, The Hunger Games
- Mayor Richard Adar (David Eick, Colm Feore), Battlestar Galactica
- Mayor "Al" (Lee Wallace) – D-New York City, The Taking of Pelham One Two Three
- Mayor John Amalfi – New York City, "Cities in Flight" short stories and novel series Science fiction, by James Blish
- Mayor Amelia (Susan Roman) - Kattelox Island, Mega Man Legends
- Mayor Eustace "Huckabone" Befufftlefumpter – Gravity Falls
- Mayor Frank Berkowitz (Sonny Bono) – Metropolis, Superman comics and Lois & Clark: The New Adventures of Superman
- Mayor Blank – The City, USA, The Tick animated series
- Mayor Johnny "The Mayor" Bledsoe – Hill Valley, The Oblongs
- Mayor Borg (Lee Wallace) – Gotham City – Batman, 1989 film
- Mayor Sergio Bustamante (Boy Olmi) – Buenos Aires, Rebelde Way
- Mayor Joe Camels – Sto Lat, Going Postal (Discworld)
- Mayor Thomas J. Carcetti (Aidan Gillen), D-Baltimore, The Wire
- Mayor Lou Carpenter, former mayor of Erinsborough in Neighbours
- Mayor Cavanaugh – New York City, CSI: Cyber
- Mayor Oswald Cobblepot – Gotham City, The Batman Adventures
- Mayor Tyler Cutebiker – Gravity Falls
- Mayor Dominic Da Vinci (Nicholas Campbell) – Vancouver, British Columbia – Da Vinci's City Hall
- Mayor Richard Dellasandro (Eric Roberts) - Los Angeles, California, Pandemic (2007)
- Mayor Bill Dewey – Beach City, Steven Universe
- Mayor Daniel Dickerson – Gotham City, Batman comics
- Mayor Roger Doofenshmirtz — Danville (in the Tri-state Area), Phineas and Ferb
- Mayor Henry Dreeson - Grantville, West Virginia/Thuringia-Franconia, 1632 series
- Mayor Ebert (Michael Lerner) – New York City, Godzilla movie
- Mayor Philip Fitzhugh – Recess
- Mayor Anthony Garcia (Nestor Carbonell) – Gotham City, The Dark Knight and The Dark Knight Rises
- Mayor Garry "Jerry" Gergich (Jim O'Heir) — Pawnee, Indiana, Parks and Recreation
- Mayor Marion Grange (Adam West) – D-Gotham City, Batman comics and The Batman animated series
- Mayor Peter Griffin (Seth MacFarlane) – New Quahog, Family Guy (episode "Da Boom")
- Mayor Grim – Bad Blintz, The Amazing Maurice and His Educated Rodents (Discworld)
- Mayor Walter Gunderson (Bill Murray) — Pawnee, Indiana, Parks and Recreation
- Mayor Mike Haggar – Metro City, New York, Final Fight
- Mayor Douglas "Doug" Hamilton (Steven Weber) – R-New Orleans, Louisiana, NCIS: New Orleans
- Mayor Jonas Henderson (Thomas Mitchell) – Hadleyville, New Mexico, High Noon
- Mayor Kate Hennings (Candice Bergen) – New York City, Sweet Home Alabama
- Mayor Pablo Herrera (Carlos Larrañaga) – Encinar de la Torre, Señor alcalde
- Mayor Hamilton Hill (Lloyd Bochner) – Gotham City, Batman comics and Batman: The Animated Series
- Mayor Roger C. Hole – Liberty City, Grand Theft Auto: Liberty City Stories
- Mayor Mitchell Hundred – New York City, Ex Machina (comic book)
- Mayor J. Jonah Jameson – New York City, Spider-Man comics
- Mayor Tom Kane – Chicago, Boss television series
- Mayor Armand Krol – R-Gotham City, Batman comics
- Mayor Victor Lang (John Slattery) – Fairview, Desperate Housewives
- Mayor Lenny (David Margulies) – New York City, Ghostbusters and Ghostbusters II
- Miss Liberty (Jane Lapotaire) – Blackbury, Johnny and the Dead (actually Chairman of the Blackbury Municipal Authority)
- Mayor Bruce Lincoln (Charles S. Dutton) – New York City, Aftershock: Earthquake in New York
- Mayor Linseed (Byron Keith) – Gotham City, Batman, 1960s TV series
- Mayor Leodore Lionheart – Zootopia
- Mayor Lipp - District 12, The Ballad of Songbirds and Snakes
- Mayor Dick Livingstone – Ubergurgl, The Amazing Maurice and His Educated Rodents (Discworld)
- Mayor Dorian Lord (Robin Strasser) – Llanview–, One Life to Live
- Mayor Doug MacKenzie (Gareth Hale) –Charnham, Family Affairs
- Mayor Maynot – The Neitherworld – Bettlejuice, TV series
- Mayor Augustus May-who – Whoville, How the Grinch Stole Christmas!
- "The Mayor" – Townsville, The Powerpuff Girls
- Mayor McCheese – McDonald's advertisements
- Mayor McDaniels – South Park, Colorado
- Mayor Modest (Walter De Donder) – unknown village in Belgium, Samson en Gert (rarely called by his real name, mostly just Meneer de Burgemeester (Mr. Mayor))
- Mayor Miles O'Donovan – Liberty City, Grand Theft Auto: Liberty City Stories
- Mayor Jack O'Leary (Don Ameche) – Chicago, In Old Chicago
- Mayor Paco (Miguel Ángel Silvestre) – Pedraza, 30 Coins
- Mayor Odorico Padaguaçu – Sucupira, O Bem-Amado
- Mayor John Pappas (Al Pacino) – New York City, City Hall
- Mayor Pinky (Rob Paulsen) – Shiny Pants, Pinky and the Brain; later elected president
- Mayor Carter Poole (David Ramsey) – New York City, Blue Bloods
- Mayor C. Randall Poopenmeyer (David Herman), New New York City, Earth, Futurama
- Mayor Oliver Queen – Star City, DC Comics
- Mayor Diamond Joe Quimby (Dan Castellaneta) – D-Springfield, The Simpsons
- Mayor Leon Quiñones (Desi Arnaz), The Escape Artist
- Mayor Sonya Rebecchi, Mayor of Erinsborough in Neighbours
- Mayor Paul Robinson, former mayor of Erinsborough in Neighbours
- Mayor Clarence V. Royce (Glynn Turman), D-Baltimore, The Wire
- Mayor Bradford Sackett – Metropolis, Superman comics
- Mayor Steven Sautter – New York City, Shadowhawk comic (Volume III, #3)
- Mayor Henry Scudder (Henry Roquemore) – Cleardale, Young Fugitives
- Mayor Homer Simpson – New Springfield, The Simpsons
- Mayor Frank Skeffington – Spencer Tracy, The Last Hurrah
- Mayor Zahra Taylor (Amanda Warren) – D-New Orleans, Louisiana, NCIS: New Orleans
- Mayor "Red" Thomas – 1955 Hill Valley, Back to the Future
- Mayor Robert Onderdonk Terwilliger (Kelsey Grammer) – R-Springfield, The Simpsons
- Mayor Tortimer – player's town – Animal Crossing
- Mayor Undersee - District 12, The Hunger Games
- Mayor Rachel Wando (Linda Hamilton) – Dante's Peak, Washington, Dante's Peak
- Mayor Adam West (Adam West) – Quahog, Rhode Island, Family Guy
- Mayor Josh West, former mayor of Summer Bay in Home and Away
- Mayoress Dame Christabel Wickham (Lucy Robinson) – Gasford, The Thin Blue Line
- Mayor Richard Wilkins III (Harry Groener) – Sunnydale, Buffy the Vampire Slayer
- Mayor "Goldie" Wilson (Donald Fullilove) – 1985 Hill Valley, Back to the Future
- Mayor Winder (Paul Birch) – The Man Who Shot Liberty Valance
- Mayor Randall Winston (Barry Bostwick) – D-New York City, Spin City sitcom
- Mayor Wilson Fisk (Vincent D'Onofrio) – New York City, Daredevil: Born Again
- Mayor Damián Navarro (Álex O'Dogherty) – Ezcaray, Olmos y Robles
- Mayor Luis Gómez (Manuel Dios) – Sagrillas, Cuéntame cómo pasó
- Mayor Anselmo Garijo (Leo Harlem) – Villaviciosa de al Lado, Villaviciosa de al lado
- The Mayor (Jorge Sanz) – Proverzo, El pregón
- The Mayor (Josep Maria Riera) – Soronelles, Ocho apellidos catalanes
- Mayor Don Mitchell Jr. (Rupert Penry-Jones) – Gotham City, The Batman
- Mayor Bill Woodruff (Jason Davis) – Dahlonega, His & Hers
- Mayor Marge Simpson (Julie Kavner) – Springfield, The Simpsons (Episode: "The Old Blue Mayor She Ain't What She Used to Be")

== Attorneys general ==
=== United States ===
- Attorney General Joanna Doyle (Eva Marie Saint) – ?- Wisconsin, Frasier
- Attorney General Daniel Larson (Sherry Houston), The West Wing
- Attorney General Alan Fisk (Dylan Baker) – D-Mississippi, The West Wing
- Attorney General Oliver Babish (Oliver Platt) – D-Illinois, The West Wing
- Attorney General Mary Campbell (Anna Deavere Smith), Madam Secretary
- Attorney General Louise Cronenberg (Leslie Hendrix), Madam Secretary
- Attorney General Nolan (John Bolton), Madam Secretary
- Attorney General Martha Wilson (Ellen Harvey) – D-?, House of Cards
- Attorney General Hoberman (Barbara Rosenblat) – D-?, Homeland

=== United Kingdom ===
- Attorney General George Matherson (Richard McCabe), Eye in the Sky

== Governors ==
=== United States ===
- Governor Mary Bailey (Maggie Roswell) – D-Springfield's state, The Simpsons
- Governor Eric Baker (Ed O'Neill) – D-Pennsylvania, The West Wing
- Governor Josiah Bartlet (Martin Sheen) – D-New Hampshire, The West Wing
- Governor Todd Chavez (Aaron Paul) - California, Bojack Horseman
- Governor Woodchuck Coodchuck-Berkowitz (Andre Braugher) - D-California, Bojack Horseman
- Governor Sam Culver (John McIntire) – Texas, Dallas
- Governor Linda Danvers – Florida In an "imaginary tale" set in a possible future in Superman Family issue #200, Supergirl, now known as Superwoman, is depicted as being the governor of Florida in her secret identity of Linda Danvers.
- Governor Samuel "Sam" Denning (Richard T. Jones) – Hawaii, Hawaii Five-0
- Governor James Devlin (Željko Ivanek) - R-"The State", Oz
- Governor Al Donnelly – (Tim Matheson) – Washington, Black Sheep
- Governor Bob Dunston – (Tracy Morgan) – Alabama, 30 Rock ("Governor Dunston")
- Governor Fido – D, Spitting Image
- Governor Kevin – "The State", Teamo Supremo
- Tri-Governor Heinz Doofenshmirtz (Dan Povenmire) – Phineas and Ferb ("Last Day of Summer")
- Governor Diane Foxington (Zazie Beetz) - California, The Bad Guys and The Bad Guys 2
- Governor Eugene Gatling (James Noble) – Connecticut, Benson
- Governor Jim W. Gettys (Ray Collins) – New York, Citizen Kane
- Governor Eleanor Grant (Marsha Mason) – California, Nick of Time
- Governor Conrad Grayson (Henry Czerny) – New York, Revenge
- Governor Jerry Haskins (Seymour Cassel) – New Mexico, Convoy
- Governor Jack Hathaway (William Petersen) – D-Virginia, The Contender
- Governor Hubert Happy Hopper (Guy Kibbee) – state unknown, Mr. Smith goes to Washington
- Governor Paul Jameson (Richard Denning) – Hawaii, Hawaii Five-O
- Governor Patricia "Pat" Jameson (Jean Smart) – Hawaii, Hawaii Five-O
- Governor William Kraft – Maine, Victoria: A Novel Of 4th Generation War
- Governor Gertrude Lang (Joanna Gleason) – Oregon, Mr Holland's Opus
- Governor William J. LePetomaine (Mel Brooks) – Western territory, Blazing Saddles
- Governor Lewis (Dan Aykroyd) – Glen Canyon, Arizona – Evolution
- Governor Caleb Lockwood (Peter Gerety) – Texas – Madam Secretary
- Governor John "Jack" Longfellow – R-Maine, John Batchelor's novel Father's Day
- Governor Robert McCallister – R-Missouri, Jack & Bobby
- Governor Sam McConaughey (Steven Weber) – Texas, Dallas (2012 TV series)
- Governor Daniel McGinty (Brian Donlevy), The Great McGinty
- Governor John J. McKay (Melvyn Douglas) – D-California, The Candidate
- Governor George McRyan – Pennsylvania, Blow Out
- Governor Charles Norin – (Scott Williamson) – Virginia, NCIS
- Governor Maria Nunez – D – Florida – Commander in Chief
- Governor Menelaus "Pappy" O'Daniel (Charles Durning) – Mississippi – O Brother, Where Art Thou?
- Governor Orlando Ozio – D-New York, Primary Colors
- Governor Fred Picker (Larry Hagman) – D-Florida, Primary Colors
- Governor James Reynolds Pryce (Tom Selleck) – D-Michigan, Running Mates
- Governor Robert Ritchie (James Brolin) – R-Florida, The West Wing
- Governor Lillian Schaefer (Faye Dunaway) - California, Pandemic (2007)
- Governor Donald Shalvoy (Tom Everett Scott) – New York, Law & Order
- Governor Jack Stanton (John Travolta) – D-Southern state, Primary Colors
- Governor Willie Stark (Broderick Crawford) later (Sean Penn) – Southern state, All the King's Men
- Governor Bill Sterling, Sr. (James Whitmore) – D-California, Mister Sterling
- Governor Ray Sullivan (Brett Cullen) – R-West Virginia, The West Wing
- Governor Sven – California, Cars
- Governor Clinton Tyree – D-Florida, Double Whammy by Carl Hiaasen
- Governor Evelyn Tracy – (Christine Ebersole) – Washington, Black Sheep
- Governor Jim Wade (William Powell) – New York, Manhattan Melodrama
- Governor Carla Williams – (Rebecca Jenkins) – California, 10.5
- Governor Leslie Knope (Amy Poehler) – D-Indiana, Parks and Recreation
- Governor Lew Edwards (Richard Crenna) – California, Jade
- Governor James Royce (Michael Gaston) – Michigan, Designated Survivor
- Governor Claire Debella (Kathryn Hahn) – Connecticut, Glass Onion: A Knives Out Mystery

=== The Caribbean ===
- Governor Elaine Marley – Tri-Island Area, Monkey Island
- Governor Weatherby Swann (Jonathan Pryce) – Jamaica, Pirates of the Caribbean trilogy

=== Elsewhere ===
- Governor, The – Pokey the Penguin
- Governor Krylar (Bill Murray) – Axia, Ant-Man and the Wasp: Quantumania
- President Edward "Ed" Piazza - Fourth of July Party-Thuringia-Franconia, United States of Europe, 1632 series
- Governor Wilhuff Tarkin (Peter Cushing) – the Outer Rim territories, Star Wars
- Governor Thropp (Andy Nyman) – Munchkinland, Wicked

== Congresspeople ==
- Congressman Sam Albert – Enemy of the State
- Congressman Albert Alger (John Michael Higgins) – The Thick of It (US version)
- Congresswoman Mackenzie Allen (Geena Davis) – I-Connecticut, Commander in Chief
- Congressman Clayton Ashford – R-Mississippi, Lash-Up (2015 novel by Larry Bond)
- Congressman Bob Arnold – corrupt politician expelled from the House, Springfield's state, The Simpsons
- Congressman Beauregard – The Simpsons
- Congressman Bob Bercolini – D-Pennsylvania, deceased, Capitol Venture, a novel by Barbara Mikulski
- Congresswoman Elizabeth Blake – Illinois, House Committee for Lunar Programs Chairman, No Man's World (1967 novel by Martin Caidin)
- Congressman Regina Bookman (Queen Latifah) – Democrat, (30 Rock)
- Congressman Button Gwinnett Brown – (Lee Tracy), Washington Merry-Go-Round
- Congresswoman Brown – Y: The Last Man
- Congressman Jason Bruce – New York, Shadowhawk comic (Volume III, #3)
- Congressman Rob Cole -(David Doty) Delaware- Legally Blonde 2: Red, White & Blonde
- Congresswoman Lacey Davenport – R-California, Doonesbury
- Congressman Davis (Len Wein) – X-Men: Days of Future Past
- Congresswoman DeLong - state unknown - JAG
- Congressman Mac Dickinson – D-California, Your Fathers, Where Are They? And the Prophets, Do They Live Forever? by Dave Eggers
- Speaker of the House of Representatives Roger Donovan (R – Kentucky) An Unprovoked Attack by F.J. McNally
- Congressman Doyle (Hal Holbrook) – The Majestic
- Congressman Ray Fuchs-(James Newman)- state unknown-Legally Blonde 2: Red, White & Blonde
- Congressman Roger Furlong (Dan Bakkedahl; Ohio) – Veep
- Congressman John Ambrose Fauntroy (Larry Peterson) – C.S.A.: The Confederate States of America
- Congressman John Ambrose Fauntroy II (Larry Peterson) – C.S.A.: The Confederate States of America
- Congresswoman Barbara Gordon – Batman
- Congresswoman Flora Hamburger-Blackford – Harry Turtledove's Southern Victory Series
- Congressman Cullee Hamilton – California, The Throne of Saturn by Allen Drury
- Congresswoman Libby Hauser (Dana Ivey)- D-Texas-, Legally Blonde 2: Red, White & Blonde
- Congressman Christopher "Chris" Higgins – House Armed Services Committee Chairman, Letter 44 (comic book series)
- Speaker Topper Huggins (D) – The People's Choice
- Representative B. Jamison - JAG
- Congressman Thomas Jefferson "Jeff" Johnson (Eddie Murphy) – D-Florida, The Distinguished Gentleman
- Congressman Johnson – The Story of Will Rogers
- Congressman Herschel Krustofski – R-Springfield's state, The Simpsons
- Congresswoman Madeline Kroft (Ruth Williamson)-state unknown- Legally Blonde 2: Red, White & Blonde
- Congresswoman Bobbi Latham (Anne-Marie Johnson) - state unknown - JAG
- Congresswoman Sally LeRoy – California, Wild in the Streets
- Congressman Robert A. Longo – D-Louisiana, No Man's World
- Congressman Stanford Marks (Bruce McGill) – R – Alabama -, Legally Blonde 2: Red, White & Blonde
- Congressman G. Martin (Raymond O'Keefe) - JAG
- Congressman Jack McCallister – D-Missouri, Jack & Bobby
- Congressman Robert McCallister – D, later R-Missouri, Jack & Bobby
- Congressman McCarter (Francois Paquette) – X-Men: Days of Future Past
- Congressman Dan "Mac" McLane – Louisiana, NCIS
- Congressman McCoy – state and party unknown – Introduces Bill in "I'm Just a Bill" – Schoolhouse Rock
- Congressman Rick Nussbaum – Republican – House Armed Services Committee Chairman, Lash-Up
- Congressman Parker (Chris Claremont) – X-Men: Days of Future Past
- Congressman Nathan Petrelli – New York, Heroes
- Congressman Israel Pond – Countdown (1970 novel by Frank G. Slaughter)
- Congressman Thad Preston – Democrat – House Minority Leader, Lash-Up
- Congressman Colin Pryce (Nicolas Cage) - D-Louisiana - The Runner
- Congresswoman Victoria Rudd – Massachusetts (Sally Field), Legally Blonde 2: Red, White & Blonde
- Congressman Raymond Shaw (Liev Schreiber) – New York, The Manchurian Candidate
- Congressman Sheldon Runyon (Gary Oldman) – R-Illinois, The Contender
- Congressman Thomas K. "Tom" Rutledge – D-Nebraska, Lash-Up
- Congressman James L. Satterthwaite – Wyoming, The Throne of Saturn
- Congressman Alex Shrub – R-Florida, Grand Theft Auto: Vice City
- Congressman Greg Stillson – The Dead Zone
- Congressman Austin Stoneman – The Birth of a Nation
- Congressman Robert Sullivan - Minnesota, The District
- Congressman Thomas "Tom" Stubbs III – Grand Theft Auto: The Lost and Damned
- Congressman Jack Tanner (Michael Murphy) – D-Michigan, Tanner '88
- Congressman Nathan Templeton, Speaker of the House (Donald Sutherland) – R-Florida, Commander in Chief
- Congressman Bernard Terpak – Democrat – Speaker of the House, Lash-Up
- Congressman Allan Trumbull – Speaker of the House, Olympus Has Fallen
- Congressman John Vassar – The Fall of a Nation
- Congressman Reginald Webster (Christian Slater) – D-Delaware, The Contender
- Congressman Horace Wilcox – Springfield's state, deceased, The Simpsons
- Congressman Williams (Stephen Kearney) - JAG
- Congressman Ben Wyatt – (D) IN-10 (later IN-09), Parks and Recreation
- Congressman David Dilbeck (Burt Reynolds) – Florida, Striptease
- Congressman Bucky Barnes (Sebastian Stan) – Marvel Cinematic Universe

== Senators ==
=== United States ===
==== Democratic senators ====
- Senator Carly Armiston (Cynthia Nixon) – New York, Alpha House
- Senator Joseph Bidet – Spitting Image
- Senator Samuel S. Chapman (Charles Durning), The Final Countdown
- State Senator Clayton Davis (Isiah Whitlock, Jr.) Baltimore, The Wire
- Senator Lillian DeHaven (Anne Bancroft) – Texas, G.I. Jane
- Senator Rock DeRickey – Spitting Image
- Senator Rosalyn DuPeche (Wanda Sykes) – Illinois, Alpha House
- Senator John Ambrose Fauntroy V (Larry Peterson) – Virginia, C.S.A.: The Confederate States of America
- Senator June Finch (Holly Hunter) – Kentucky, Batman v Superman: Dawn of Justice
- Senator Ortolan Finistirre (William H. Macy) – Vermont, Thank You for Smoking
- Senator Ellen Fischer – California, A Time to Run
- Senator Parker Gable (Robert Culp) – Running Mates
- Senator Gary Garthington – Spitting Image
- Senator Eleanor Gorzack – Pennsylvania, Capitol Venture by Barbara Mikulski
- Senator Laine Hanson (Joan Allen) – Ohio, The Contender
- Senator Clarence Helmsley (Edward See) – Vermont, C.S.A.: The Confederate States of America
- Senator Henry McGuire (Bob Sweeney) – Arkansas, Starfire (1960 novel by Robert Buckner) / Moon Pilot (1962 film)
- Senator elect Bill McKay (Robert Redford) – California, The Candidate
- Senator Douglas Monroe – Ohio, The Walking Dead
- Senator Brickley Paiste (Gore Vidal) – Pennsylvania, Bob Roberts
- Senator David Palmer (Dennis Haysbert) – Maryland, 24
- Senator Terrence Randall (Bob Gunton) – Colorado, Running Mates
- Senator Pete Ross – Kansas, Superman
- Senator Harry Rutledge (Daniel Pilon) – Shoot 'Em Up
- Senator Tom Rutledge – Kentucky, Lash-Up (2001 novella by Larry Bond)
- Senator Joseph Tynan (Alan Alda) – New York, The Seduction of Joe Tynan
- Senator John Waltzer – Virginia, Mission: Impossible
- Senator Tom Wright (Joe Morton) – New Jersey, House

==== Republican senators ====
- Senator Jack Bowman (Mark Deklin) - Montana, Designated Survivor
- Senator Robert Bettencourt (Clark Johnson) – Pennsylvania, Alpha House
- Senator Gil John Biggs (John Goodman) – North Carolina, Alpha House
- Senator Maureen Gaylord – Executive Privilege by Phillip Margolin
- Senator Andy Guzman (Mark Consuelos) – Florida, Alpha House
- Senator Crocker Jarmon (Don Porter) – California, The Candidate
- Senator Alex P. Keaton (Michael J. Fox) – Ohio, Spin City
- Senator John Keeler (Geoff Pierson) – 24
- Senator Kevin Keeley (Gene Hackman) – 'The Birdcage
- Senator Louis Laffer (Matt Malloy) – Nevada, Alpha House
- Senator Robert Lipton (Jack Coleman) – Pennsylvania, The Office
- Senator Robert McCallister (Rob Lowe) – California, Brothers & Sisters
- Senator Mitchell Morris (Bruce McGill) – Texas, Running Mates
- Senator Dennis Morganthal – Missouri, Jack & Bobby
- Senator Judson Pilager (Michael Murphy) – R-Colorado, Silver City
- Senator Jim Proust – The Third Twin
- Senator Bob Roberts (Tim Robbins) – Pennsylvania, Bob Roberts
- Senator Lister Ames Rosewater - Indiana, God Bless You, Mr. Rosewater
- Senator Bob Rumson (Richard Dreyfuss) – Kansas, The American President
- Senator Mary Ellen Spinkle (Christine Baranski) – Marci X
- Senator Hubert S. Toombs (Richard Herman) – Georgia, C.S.A.: The Confederate States of America
- Senator Arnold Vinick – California, The West Wing
- Senator Christian Ward (Tim DeKay) – Massachusetts – Agents of S.H.I.E.L.D.

==== Other parties ====
- Senator Rebecca Stearns - Fourth of July - Grantville, 1632 series
- Senator Howell Tankerbell (Bob Odenkirk) – Dixiecrat, Mr. Show with Bob and David

==== Unknown affiliations ====
- Senator Steven Abercombie III (John Getz) – California, A Day Without a Mexican
- Senator Elizabeth Ames Adams – Kansas, Advise and Consent
- Senator Dale Lee Agsby (Simon Kunz) – Brass Eye
- Senator Allbright (Ed Begley) – Wild in the Streets
- Senator Brigham Anderson – Utah, Advise and Consent
- Senator Alan Armstrong (Christopher McDonald) – California, SGU Stargate Universe
- Senator Steven Armstrong (Alastair Duncan) – Colorado, Metal Gear Rising: Revengeance
- Senator Melvin G. Ashton (William Powell) – The Senator Was Indiscreet
- Senator Tom August – Minnesota, Advise and Consent
- Senator Henry Babcock – (Thurston Hall) – Sherlock Holmes in Washington
- Senator Elliot Baines (James Cromwell) – Washington, Citizen Baines
- Senator Barrington (James Karen) - JAG
- Senator John "Bluto" Blutarsky (John Belushi) – National Lampoon's Animal House
- Senator Senator Wyndom Brody (Bruce Boxleitner), Decompression, an episode of The Outer Limits
- Senator Brickman (Michael Lerner) – X-Men: Days of Future Past
- Senator Helen Brucker (Stacey Travis) – California, Angel
- Senator J. Billington Bulworth (Warren Beatty) - California, Bulworth
- Senator Charlotte Burton (Lauren Holly)- New York, Alphas
- Senator Beauregard Claghorn (Kenny Delmar) – Southerner, The Fred Allen Show
- Senator Colby (Berton Churchill) – Illinois, In Old Chicago
- Senator Jeffrey Collins (John Allen Nelson), Vanished
- Senator Seabright B. Cooley – South Carolina, Advise and Consent
- Senator Stanley Danta – Connecticut, Advise and Consent
- Senator John DeWilton – Vermont, Advise and Consent
- Senator Billy Doggs – Tennessee, The People's Choice
- Senator Johnny Fergus (Hal Holbrook) – California, Wild in the Streets
- Senator Ralph Fellows – California, Senate Minority Leader, The Pilgrim Project (1964 novel by Hank Searls)
- Senator Harrison Fisher – The Dead Zone
- Senator Hal Fry – West Virginia, Advise and Consent
- Senator Ross Garrison, Person of Interest
- Senator Pat Geary (G. D. Spradlin) – Nevada, The Godfather Part II
- Senator Jefferson Davis Graham – New York, Girl Meets World
- Senator Grant (John Hamilton) – The Great Man's Lady
- Senator Ted Greenfield (Charles Trowbridge) – The Great Lie
- Senator Phil Hammersleigh (Jason Robards) – Enemy of the State
- Senator Powell Hanson – North Dakota, Advise and Consent
- Senator Lawrence Harris (Kevin Cooney), Primary Colors
- Senator Huyler (William Farnum), Tennessee Johnson
- Senator John Iselin (James Gregory), The Manchurian Candidate
- Senator Edward H. "Big Ed" Jones (Thurston Hall) – Wilson
- Senator Thomas Jordan (Jon Voight) – The Manchurian Candidate
- Senator Robert Kelly (Bruce Davison) – X-Men comics and film
- Senator Martha Kent (Annette O'Toole) – Kansas, Smallville
- Senator Patrick Kiley (Tim DeKay) – NCIS
- Senator Orrin Knox – Illinois, Advise and Consent
- Senator Ed Lauterback (Pierre Watkin) – State of the Union
- Senator Randolph K. Lindle – Kansas, Dreadful Sanctuary (1948 novel by Eric Frank Russell)
- Senator Lockhart (John Getz) – California, NCIS: Los Angeles
- Senator MacVickers (Harry Davenport) – Government Girl
- Senator Aaron McComb (Ron Silver) – Timecop
- Senator Marquand (Fritz Hollings) – City Hall
- Senator Charles Martin (Chelcie Ross), Primary Colors
- Senator Ruth Martin (Diane Baker) – Tennessee, The Silence of the Lambs
- Senator Oscar Martinez (Oscar Nunez) – Pennsylvania, The Office
- Senator Richard Matheson (Raymond J. Barry) – The X-Files
- Senator Horace Maydew (Berton Churchill) – Kentucky, Judge Priest
- Senator Jackson McCanles (Lionel Barrymore) – Texas, Duel in the Sun
- Senator Aaron McComb (Ron Silver) – Timecop
- Senator Charles F. Meachum (Ned Beatty) – Montana, Shooter
- Senator Mendoza – The House of the Scorpion
- Senator Morton (Leo G. Carroll) – Strangers on a Train
- Senator Roy Mullholland – Michigan, Advise and Consent
- Senator Robert Durham Munson – Michigan, Advise and Consent
- Senator Ellen Nadeer (Parminder Nagra), Agents of S.H.I.E.L.D.
- Senator Edward T. Norton (Alan Dinehart) – Washington Merry-Go-Round
- Senator John Neal (Craig T. Nelson) – Wag the Dog
- Senator Maria Nunez (Sally Shamrell) - South Carolina, Agents of S.H.I.E.L.D.
- Senator Denise O'Hara (Bess Armstrong), NCIS
- Senator Dick Osborne (Sam Anderson) – California, NCIS: Los Angeles
- Senator Francis Owen, No Man's World (1967 novel by Martin Caidin)
- Senator Joseph Harrison Paine (Claude Rains) – Mr. Smith Goes to Washington
- Senator Charles Palantine (Leonard Harris) – New York, Taxi Driver
- Senator Neptune Perkins – D-Hawaii – DC Comics
- Senator William Powers (John Forsythe) – The Powers That Be
- Senator Silas P. Ratcliffe – Illinois, Democracy: An American Novel
- Senator Carlton Riley – Missouri, The Affair
- Senator Timothy Roberts (Dudley Digges) – Alexander Hamilton
- Senator Judson Ross (James Cromwell) – Virginia, Species II
- Senator Sedgewick Sexton – Delaware, Deception Point
- Senator Eleanor Prentice Shaw (Meryl Streep) – Virginia, The Manchurian Candidate
- Senator John Shaw (Dan Olmstead) – Virginia, The Manchurian Candidate
- Senator Jefferson Smith (James Stewart) – Mr. Smith Goes to Washington
- Senator Lafe Smith – Iowa, Advise and Consent
- Senator Bill Sterling, Jr. (Josh Brolin) – California, Mister Sterling
- Senator Ransom Stoddard (James Stewart) – The Man Who Shot Liberty Valance
- Senator Hays Stowe (Hal Holbrook), The Bold Ones: The Senator
- Senator Warren Strickland – Idaho, Advise and Consent
- Senator Lars Todt – Countdown (1970 novel by Frank G. Slaughter)
- Senator Fred Van Ackerman – Wyoming, Advise and Consent
- Senator Bliss Wagoner – Alaska, Cities in Flight
- Senator Jim Waters (Charles Dingle) – Tennessee Johnson
- Senator Clarence Wannamaker – Montana, Advise and Consent
- Senator Wen (Ming-Na) – Eureka
- Senator Wylie (Walter Connolly) – Washington Merry-Go-Round
- Senator Gene Williams (Chuck McCollum) - Minnesota, Agents of S.H.I.E.L.D.
- Senator Kennicut "Kenny" Williams – Indiana, The Throne of Saturn
- Senator John Able Winthrop – Massachusetts, Advise and Consent and The Throne of Saturn
- Senator Eustace Womersley – Dreadful Sanctuary

=== Elsewhere ===
- Senator Bail Organa (Jimmy Smits) - Alderaan, Star Wars
- Senator Decius Caecilius Metellus the Younger – Roman Senate, SPQR series novels by John Maddox Roberts
- Senator Mon Mothma – Star Wars
- Senator Sheev Palpatine (Ian McDiarmid) – Star Wars
- Gaius Ponarian (Patrick Fabian), Agents of S.H.I.E.L.D.

== Presidents ==
=== A to D ===
- President Datu Andrada (Joel de la Fuente) – Philippines, Madam Secretary episode "Break in Democracy"
- President Richard Adar (Lew Ayres) – The Twelve Colonies, Battlestar Galactica
- President Antonov – Soviet Union, Clive Cussler's Dirk Pitt novels
- President Jonathan Archer (Scott Bakula) – United Federation of Planets, Star Trek: Enterprise
- President Gaius Baltar (James Callis) – The Twelve Colonies, Battlestar Galactica
- President André Baptiste – Liberia, Lord of War
- Président Grace Bellanger (Anne Consigny) – French Republic, l'État de Grace
- Lord President Borusa (Leonard Sachs, Philip Latham) – Gallifrey, Doctor Who
- President Victor de Bourcey – European Union, Super-State (Brian Aldiss, 2002)
- President Franciszek Budziak (Tomasz Karolak) – Poland, Servant of the People
- Acting President Lucas Cabrera (Edu Manzano) – Philippines, Ang Probinsyano
- President/General Bill Carver (Anthony Ruivivar) – Texas, Revolution
- President Alma Coin (Julianne Moore) – District 13 (Part 1) and Panem (Part 2), The Hunger Games
- President Hillary Dafalong (Gloria Diaz) – Philippines, Ang Tanging Ina N'yong Lahat
- President Józef Demko (Piotr Adamczyk) – Poland, Madam Secretary
- Lord President Doctor (Tom Baker, Peter Davison) – Gallifrey, Doctor Who (twice, abandoned office both times)

=== E to M ===
- President John Henry Eden (Malcolm McDowell) - Enclave, Fallout 3
- El Presidente, - Tropico, Tropico series
- President Rufus T. Firefly (Groucho Marx) – Freedonia, Duck Soup
- President George Formby – England, Thursday Next novels
- President Vasily Goloborodko (Volodymyr Zelenskyy) – Ukraine, Servant of the People
- President Kelly Foster (Leslie Hope) – Georgia Federation, Revolution
- President Vincent Harling – Osean Federation, Ace Combat 5: The Unsung War
- Hereditary President Sidney Harris – People's Republic of Haven, Honorverse
- President Oscar Hidalgo (Rowell Santiago) – Philippines, Ang Probinsyano
- President Sam Houston — Republic of Texas, The Difference Engine
- President Hsieh Kuo-jen (Tsai An-lung) - Taiwan, The Sadness
- President Jaresh-Inyo (Herschel Sparber) – United Federation of Planets, Star Trek: Deep Space Nine
- President Harriet Jones – Great Britain, mentioned in the Doctor Who episode "Doomsday"
- President Kitenge – Pepsi presents New Zanzibar, The Simpsons
- President Ignacy Konieczny (Marcin Hycnar) – Poland, Servant of the People
- President Ferdynand Kiepski (Andrzej Grabowski) – Republic of Timbuktu, The Lousy World episode "Kiepski prezydent"
- President Yueh-chen Lin – Taiwan, Wave Makers
- President Lindberg – United Federated Territories, The Fifth Element
- President Agustín Mendilaharzu (Héctor Bidonde) - Argentina, Los simuladores
- President Mon Mothma – Galactic Republic, Star Wars
- President/General Sebastian Monroe (David Lyons) – Monroe Republic, Revolution
- President Ina Montecillo (Ai-Ai delas Alas) – Philippines, Ang Tanging Ina N'yong Lahat
- President Muntu – Pepsi presents New Zanzibar, The Simpsons

=== M to Z ===
- President (formerly Major General) Brent Haywood, Republic of New Zealand, in Craig Harrison's Broken October (1976).
- President Sergey Makarenko (Zinaid Memišević) – Russia, 2012
- President Napoleon – Animal Farm, Animal Farm
- President Andrei Narmonov – Soviet Union – Ryanverse
- President Head of Richard Nixon – Earth, Futurama
- President Leia Organa-Solo – Galactic Republic, Star Wars
- President Pavel Ostrov (Olek Krupa) – Russia, Madam Secretary
- President Maria Ostrova (Angela Gots) – Russia, Madam Secretary
- President/Commander Paylor (Patina Miller) – Panem, The Hunger Games
- President Józef Pokrak (Kazimierz Krzaczkowski) – Poland, The Lousy World episode "Kiepski prezydent"
- Lord President Rassilon (Richard Mathews, Don Warrington, & Timothy Dalton) – Gallifrey, Doctor Who
- President Laira Rillak (Chelah Horsdal) - United Federation of Planets, Star Trek Discovery
- President Michael Rimmer (Peter Cook) – Great Britain, The Rise and Rise of Michael Rimmer
- Lady President Romana (Lalla Ward) – Gallifrey, various Doctor Who spin-offs
- President Laura Roslin (Mary McDonnell) – the Twelve Colonies, Battlestar Galactica
- President Thaddeus Ross (Harrison Ford) – United States, Captain America: Brave New World
- President Arnold Schwarzenegger – Just Mentioned, Demolition Man
- President Najid Shiraz (Houshang Touzie) – Iran, Madam Secretary
- President Robert Sinclair – Federation of Central Usea, Ace Combat 04: Shattered Skies
- President Skroob (Mel Brooks) – Planet Spaceball, Spaceballs
- President Coriolanus Snow (Donald Sutherland) – Panem, The Hunger Games
- President Ling-hsien Sun – Taiwan, Wave Makers
- President Sung Chung-jen (Ko I-chen) – Taiwan, Zero Day
- President Yuri Suvarov (Nick Jameson) – Russia, 24
- President Francis Joseph Underwood (Kevin Spacey) – United States, House of Cards
- President Paulo Ventura (Domingos Montagner) - Brazil, O Brado Retumbante
- President Garrett Walker (Michael Gill) – House of Cards
- President Edmund Zuwanie (Earl Cameron) – Democratic Republic of Matobo, The Interpreter

=== Unnamed ===
- Unnamed Lord President (Llewellyn Rees) – Gallifrey, Doctor Who serial The Deadly Assassin
- Unnamed Federation President (Robert Ellenstein) – United Federation of Planets, Star Trek IV: The Voyage Home
- Unnamed Federation President (Kurtwood Smith) – United Federation of Planets, Star Trek VI: The Undiscovered Country
- Unnamed President (Orlin Goranov) – Bulgaria, Mission London
- Unnamed President (Don Warrington) – Great Britain, Doctor Who episode "Rise of the Cybermen"
- Unnamed President (Krzysztof Dracz) – Poland, The Lousy World episode "Zmiana"

== Councilors ==
- Councilwoman Elizabeth Alderman – New York, New Titans comics
- Alderman Thomas Bowler (George Baker) – Blackbury, Johnny and the Dead
- Councilman Thomas Carcetti (Aidan Gillen) – Baltimore, The Wire
- Councillor Degra – Xindi-Primates, Star Trek: Enterprise
- Councillor Duras (Patrick Massett)- Qo'noS, Star Trek: The Next Generation
- Councillor Jannar – Xindi-Arboreals, Star Trek: Enterprise
- Councillor Mallora – Xindi-Primates, Star Trek: Enterprise
- Councillor Charivretha zh'Thane – Andor, Deep Space Nine relaunch novels
- Councillor Kao-Chang Yu-min (Yang Kuei-mei) - Taiwan, The World Between Us: After the Flames
- Councillor Wang Wen-ter (Huang Di-yang) - Taiwan, Tears on Fire

== Members of Parliament ==
=== Canadian Parliament ===
- David J. Broadfoot MP (Dave Broadfoot) – New Apathetic Party – Kicking Horse Pass, Royal Canadian Air Farce
- Nellie Gordon MP (Joanne Miller) – New Democratic Party – East Nova, Backbencher
- Quentin Durgens MP (Gordon Pinsent) – Hampton County, Quentin Durgens, M.P.
- Herb Proctor MP (Lee J. Campbell) – Conservative Party of Canada, Backbencher
- Henri Villon MP – Liberal Party of Canada, Night Probe!

=== European Parliament ===
- Elisa Correr MEP – ALDE, Operation Red Dragon comic
- Imelda Kleist MEP (Brigitte Khan) – German Green Party-Obersaxony, The New Statesman
- Count Otto Von Munchweiller MEP (Benedick Blythe) – Obersaxony, The New Statesman
- Irina Vega MEP – Troubled Waters comic

=== Japanese Parliament ===
- Count Aritsune Hanakoji, Sakura Wars

=== Scottish Parliament ===
- Jim McClaren MSP (Tony Osoba) – SNP, Porridge, Life Beyond the Box: Norman Stanley Fletcher

=== Federal Assembly of the Socialist Federal Republic of Yugoslavia ===
- Ibrahim Salihović – League of Communists of Yugoslavia – Bosnia-Hercegovina, Between Mountains, novel by Maggie Helwig

=== Legislative Yuan of Taiwan ===
- Chang Jung-liang (Christopher Lung) - What the Hell Is Love
- Chiang Ter-jen (Jag Huang) - Port of Lies
- Kao Cheng-kuang (Hsueh Shih-ling) - The World Between Us: After the Flames

=== United Kingdom ===
- Thomas Shelby – MP for Birmingham South in TV show Peaky Blinders
- Barbara Batten - MP for South Oxfordshire in Endeavour.
- Julian Fawcett - Late Conservative MP of an unnamed seat in Ghosts (UK).
- Rachel Fawcett - daughter of Julian and Green MP of an unnamed seat in Ghosts (UK).

== First/prime ministers ==
=== Named ===
- Prime Minister Richard Adderly (Bruce Greenwood) – Canada, The Summit
- First Minister Asarem Wadeen – Bajor, Deep Space Nine relaunch novels
- Prime Minister Atkinson – Country League Party – New Zealand, Craig Harrison's Tomorrow Will Be A Lovely Day (1971) and Broken October (1976).
- Prime Minister Robert Bowman (Nigel Whitmey) – Canada, London Has Fallen
- Prime Minister Brian – New Zealand, Flight of the Conchords
- Prime Minister Sam Clarke (Idris Elba) – United Kingdom, Heads of State
- Prime Minister David (Hugh Grant) – United Kingdom, Love Actually
- Prime Minister Hilda Fitzherbert – "Federated British Empire," Julius Vogel's Anno Domini 2000, or, Woman's Destiny (1889)
- Prime Minister Abdrahman Godzihkty – Kazakhstan, Peter Nevsky and the True Story of the Russian Moon Landing (1993 novel by John Calvin Batchelor)
- Prime Minister Gorgak – Trisol, Futurama
- First Minister Kalem Apren – Bajor, Star Trek: Deep Space Nine
- Prime Minister Yoko Kayabuki – Japan, Ghost in the Shell: Stand Alone Complex
- Prime Minister Douglas Kendrick – Country League Party – New Zealand, Craig Harrison's Tomorrow Will Be A Lovely Day (1971) and Broken October (1976).
- Prime Minister Kruel (Josef Swickard) – Oz, The Wizard of Oz
- Prime Minister Cezary Kujawa (Krzysztof Dracz) – Poland, Servant of the People
- Prime Minister Marc Lavigne (Guy Nadon) – Canada, H_{2}O
- Prime Minister Lee Tae-Woo (Keong Sim) - South Korea, Olympus Has Fallen
- Prime Minister Barrett Lindsay – Country League Party – New Zealand, Craig Harrison's Tomorrow Will Be A Lovely Day (1971) and Broken October (1976)
- Prime Minister Clark MacDonald (Wallace Shawn) – Canada, Canadian Bacon
- Prime Minister Matthew McLaughlin – Canada, H_{2}O
- Prime Minister Thomas David McLaughlin (Paul Gross) – Canada, H_{2}O
- Prime Minister Count Rupert Mountjoy (Peter Sellers) – Grand Fenwick, The Mouse That Roared
- Prime Minister Baron Von Neuhoff (Montagu Love) – Lichtenburg, The Son of Monte Cristo
- Prime Minister Seryozha Viktrovich Nikanor – Union of Yuktobanian Republics, Ace Combat 5: The Unsung War
- Prime Minister Birgitte Nyborg (Sidse Babett Knudsen) – Denmark, Borgen
- Prime Minister Emily Richards - Mars, The Expanse
- Premier Alexander Romanov – Soviet Union, Command & Conquer: Red Alert 2 computer game
- Prime Minister Charles Sarveaux – Canada, Night Probe!
- Prime Minister Harold Saxon (John Simm) – United Kingdom, Doctor Who
- First Minister Shakaar Edon (Duncan Regehr) – Bajor, Star Trek: Deep Space Nine
- Prime Minister Nathan Smith - Mars, The Expanse
- Prime Minister Michael "Mike" Stearns - Fourth of July Party - United States of Europe, Eric Flint's 1632
- Prime Minister James Steward (Alexander Skarsgård) – Canada, Long Shot
- Prime Minister Allen Summervale, Duke of Cromarty – Star Kingdom of Manticore, Honorverse
- Prime Minister Pedro Vilches (Bertín Osborne) – Spain, Torrente for President
- Prime Minister (effective dictator) Volkner – New Zealand, C. K. Stead's Smiths Dream (1971), filmed as Sleeping Dogs (1977)
- Acting First Minister Winn Adami (Louise Fletcher) – Bajor, Star Trek: Deep Space Nine

=== Unnamed ===
- The Prime Minister (Aubert Pallascio) – Canada, The Kidnapping of the President
- Unnamed Vice Premier (Wang Chung-Huang) - Taiwan, Q18 Quantum Dice: Allegory of the Quantum
- Unnamed Chancellor (Merrilyn Gann) – Germany, 2012
- Unnamed Prime Minister (Leonard Tenisci) – Italy, 2012
- Unnamed Prime Minister (Joan Carreras) – Spain, Su majestad

== Cabinet secretaries, officers and ministers ==
=== United States ===
- Secretary of Energy Shirley Abbott (Dianne Wiest), Category 6: Day of Destruction
- Secretary of Defense David Brice (Gene Hackman), No Way Out
- Secretary of State Ellie Brilliard (April Grace), Behind Enemy Lines II: Axis of Evil
- Secretary of State Theodore "Theo" Burke, Ph.D., Zero-G, 2007 novel by Alton Gansky
- Secretary of State Hugh Cambridge, Lash-Up (2015 novel by Larry Bond)
- Secretary of State Jack Douglas (Nicholas Pryor), Executive Decision
- Secretary of Defense Preble Haugland, No Man's World (1967 novel by Martin Caidin)
- Secretary of Defense James Heller (William Devane), 24
- National Security Advisor Al "AJ" Johnson, Letter 44
- Secretary of Defense Sam Lane, DC Comics
- Secretary of State Elizabeth McCord (Téa Leoni), Madam Secretary
- Secretary of Defense Adrian Michter, Letter 44
- United States Attorney General Vincent Nash, Minority Report
- Secretary of Defense Everett Peck, Lash-Up (2001 novella and 2015 novel by Larry Bond)
- National Security Advisor Jeffrey Pelt (Richard Jordan), The Hunt for Red October
- Secretary of Education Jefferson Pierce, DC Comics
- Secretary of Defense Dell Rusk, Avengers
- Secretary of Metahuman Affairs Sarge Steel, DC Comics
- Secretary of Defense Lynne Warner (Sharon Gless), The State Within
- Secretary of Metahuman Affairs Amanda Waller, DC Comics
- Secretary of Defense Charles White (Len Cariou), Executive Decision
- Secretary of Defense Tony Stark, Iron Man
- Secretary of State Thaddeus Ross, Captain America: Civil War (William Hurt)
- Secretary of Health and Human Services, Margaret Pierson, The Strain
- Secretary of the Interior (Kenny Delmar), War of the Worlds (1938)
- Secretary of Agriculture (Maurice Copeland), Trading Places
- Secretary of Defense Ruth McMillan (Melissa Leo), Olympus Has Fallen
- Secretary of Defense Serling Bernstein (Holt McCallany), Mission: Impossible – The Final Reckoning
- Secretary of State Walters (Janet McTeer), Mission: Impossible – The Final Reckoning
- Confederate States Secretary of State John Ambrose Fauntroy III (Larry Peterson) – CS, C.S.A.: The Confederate States of America

=== Poland ===
- Minister of Health Zygmunt Łubicz (Krzysztof Kowalewski) – Poland, Daleko od noszy. Reanimacja

=== Spain ===
- Minister of Agriculture Juan Carrasco (Javier Cámara) – Spain, Vota Juan

=== United Kingdom ===
- Sir Les Patterson, Minister for the Arts and Minister for Sport. Played by Barry Humphries in various media.
- Secretary of State for Defence Talia Ross (Lydia Leonard) – United Kingdom, Down Cemetery Road

==== Harry Potter Series - Minister of Magic ====
- Minister for Magic Cornelius Fudge – United Kingdom, Harry Potter
- Minister for Magic Rufus Scrimgeour – United Kingdom, Harry Potter
- Minister for Magic Pius Thicknesse – United Kingdom, Harry Potter
- Minister for Magic Kingsley Shacklebolt – United Kingdom, Harry Potter

=== Fictional Countries ===
- Nathan Samuels (Harry Groener) – Earth, Star Trek: Enterprise
- Foreign Minister Hajjaj – Zuwayza, Darkness

== Grand viziers ==
- Abrim – Klatch, Sourcery (Discworld)
- Alhazared – Land of the Green Isles(King's Quest VI)
- Lord Hong – Agatean Empire, Interesting Times (Discworld)
- Iznogoud – from the television series of the same name
- Jafar – Agrabah, Aladdin
- Nine-Turning-Mirrors – Agatean Empire, The Colour of Magic and Mort (Discworld)
- Sate Pestage – Galactic Empire, Star Wars
- Twoflower – Agatean Empire, Interesting Times (Discworld)

== Ambassadors ==
- Unnamed Ambassador – Ferrero Rocher advertisements
- Unnamed Ambassador – United States, Good Omens
- Spanish Ambassador – Spain, Madeline
- Ambassador Ludigan Abel – Ambassador of Trantor, a major empire ruling half a million worlds, in Isaac Asimov's The Currents of Space
- Ambassador Caithlin Dar – (Cynthia Gouw) Romulan Star Empire, Star Trek V: The Final Frontier
- Ambassador Curzon Dax – United Federation of Planets, Star Trek: Deep Space Nine
- Ambassador Delenn – Minbar, Babylon 5
- Ambassador G'Kar – Narn Regime, Babylon 5
- Ambassador Gregory (Henry Stephenson) – Russia, Rendezvous
- Ambassador Bill Harper (Will Rogers) – Sylvania, Ambassador Bill
- Ambassador K'Ehleyr – United Federation of Planets, Star Trek: The Next Generation
- Ambassador Kosh – Vorlon, Babylon 5
- Ambassador Londo Mollari – Centauri Republic, Babylon 5
- Ambassador Mourain (Ben Kingsley) – United States, "Rules of Engagement"
- Ambassador Noonan (Danielle Kennedy) – United States, "Narcos"
- Ambassador Park Jung-Soo – South Korea, Lie to Me television series
- Ambassador Luis Salinas (Abel Folk) – Spain, La embajada
- Ambassador Sarek (Mark Lenard) – United Federation of Planets, Star Trek: The Original Series
- Ambassador Mickey Shea – The Godfather Returns
- Ambassador Spock (Leonard Nimoy) – United Federation of Planets, Star Trek: The Next Generation
- Ambassador Duncan Stewart – Australia, Embassy
- Ambassador St. John Talbot (David Warner) – United Federation of Planets, Star Trek V: The Final Frontier
- Ambassador Damien Thorn – United States, Omen III: The Final Conflict
- Ambassador Robert Thorn – United States, The Omen
- Ambassador His Grace Sir Samuel Vimes – Ankh-Morpork, The Fifth Elephant
- Ambassador Wikked (Otto Lederer) – Oz, The Wizard of Oz
- Ambassador Worf – United Federation of Planets, the final episode of Star Trek: Deep Space Nine and subsequent novels

== Miscellaneous ==
- Antonius - Minister of Defense of Panem (Robert Knepper) - The Hunger Games
- District Attorney Adair (Ray Collins) – Touch of Evil
- District Attorney Joseph Foster (Thomas Mitchell) – Alias Nick Beal
- District Attorney Galloway (Carl Frank) – The Lady from Shanghai
- District Attorney Thomas Mara (Jerome Cowan) – Miracle on 34th Street
- District Attorney Russell Quinton (Vincent Price) – Leave Her to Heaven
- District Attorney Samantha Reyes (Michelle Hurd) – Daredevil
- District Attorney Blake Tower (Stephen Rider) – Daredevil
- Egeria - Minister of Interior of Panem (Sarita Choudhury) - The Hunger Games: Mockingjay - Part 1
- George Papoon (by allusion, only), – candidate for "Chief Resident" under the National Surrealist Light People's Party, in Martian Space Party; a film by The Firesign Theatre. Audio from the staged nominating convention was then repurposed for the LP album, Not Insane or Anything You Want To.
- Woody Boyd, Boston councilman in Cheers
- Vilos Cohaagen (Ronny Cox) – Mars Administrator in Total Recall
- Sven (Scott Clark), Governor of California in Cars
- Fred Davis (Albert Reed, Jr.) – dishonest alderman from Good Times
- Rachel Dawes, Assistant District Attorney in Batman Begins (played by Katie Holmes) and The Dark Knight (played by Maggie Gyllenhaal)
- Harvey Dent, District Attorney in Batman comics, 1989 film (played by Billy Dee Williams), and The Dark Knight (played by Aaron Eckhart)
- Colonel Sebastian Doyle (Craig Charles) – section chief of CGI, Head of the Ministry of Alteration, Dave Lister's fascist dictator alter ego in a drug-induced hallucination, Red Dwarf, Back To Reality
- Benson DuBois (Robert Guillaume), Budget Director and later Lieutenant Governor of unnamed New England state (presumably Connecticut) in the TV show Benson
- Borsk Fey'lya, Star Wars universe, career politician, eventual Chief of State of the New Republic
- Emmanuel Goldstein, former top member of the Party in Nineteen Eighty-Four
- Sir Martin Luther King Jr. – governor-general of the North American Union, a Canada-like nation consisting of all of North America less Alaska and including Baja California in the British Empire, The Two Georges by Harry Turtledove and Richard Dreyfuss (1996, novel)
- Commissioner Maurice (André Maranne) – Yes Minister: Party Games
- Ertuğrul Bey (Engin Altan Düzyatan and Tamer Yiğit)- Uç Bey of the Sultanate of Rum in Diriliş: Ertuğrul and Kuruluş: Osman.
- Havelock Vetinari – Patrician of Ankh-Morpork (Discworld)
- King Bradley – Fuhrer of Amestris in Fullmetal Alchemist
- Cornelius Fudge - Minister for Magic (Harry Potter)
- Rufus Scrimgeour – Minister for Magic (Harry Potter)
- Albus Dumbledore – Chief Warlock of the Wizengamot (Harry Potter)
- Kingsley Shacklebolt – Minister for Magic (Harry Potter)
- Lord High Chancellor – Iolanthe
- Undersecretary of the Ministry of Time Salvador Martí (Jaime Blanch) – El ministerio del tiempo
- Secretary-General Esteban Sorrento-Gillis – United Nations, The Expanse
- Secretary-General Nancy Gao – United Nations, The Expanse
- Secretary-General Chrisjen Avasarala – United Nations, The Expanse
- Secretary-General David Paster– United Nations, The Expanse
- Director Sarah "Sigma" Fisher - Eden, Captain Laserhawk: A Blood Dragon Remix

== See also ==
- List of fictional political parties
- List of fictional presidents of the United States
- List of fictional prime ministers of the United Kingdom
- List of fictional British monarchs
