= List of fictional British politicians =

== Monarchs ==
See List of fictional British monarchs

== Prime ministers ==
See List of fictional British Prime Ministers

== Cabinet secretaries and ministers ==
=== Chancellors of the Exchequer ===
- Gillian Calderwood MP (Selina Cadell), Spooks
- The Rt. Hon. Eric Jeffries MP, Yes, Prime Minister
- Lawrence Wainwright MP, A Very British Coup
- The Rt. Hon. Catherine Walker MP, The Amazing Mrs Pritchard

=== Defence secretaries ===
- Sir Frederick Gray (Geoffrey Keen), The Spy Who Loved Me, Moonraker, For Your Eyes Only, Octopussy, A View to a Kill, and The Living Daylights
- Geoff Holhurst MP (Rob Edwards), The Thick of It
- The Rt. Hon. Sir Maxwell Hopkins MP, Yes, Prime Minister

=== Education secretaries ===
- The Rt. Hon. Henry Snodgrass MP, Yes, Prime Minister

==== Ministers of Education ====
- The Rt. Hon. Hugo Culpepper-Brown PC MP (Eric Barker), Blue Murder at St Trinian's (later Minister of State for Schools)
- John McNonentity MP, Spitting Image
- The Rt. Hon. Geoffrey Thwaites PC MP (Colin Firth), St Trinian's

=== Environment secretaries ===
- Annita Burke MP, House of Cards Trilogy
- Michael Samuels MP, House of Cards Trilogy
- The Rt. Hon. Brian Smithson MP, Yes, Prime Minister

=== Foreign secretaries ===
- Geoffrey Booza-Pitt MP – House of Cards Trilogy
- Patrick Woolton MP – House of Cards Trilogy
- James Allan MP (Alex Jennings), Spooks, 2003–2006
- Rachel Beauchamp MP (Jill Baker), Spooks, 2008–2010
- Ruth Chambers MP (Angela Bruce), Spooks, 2006–2008
- Lord Hilary Kilvert MP, The Five Royal Coachmen
- The Rt. Hon. Duncan Short MP, Yes, Prime Minister
- The Rt. Hon. Dorothy Crowther MP, The Amazing Mrs Pritchard

=== Home Secretary ===
- Nicholas Blake MP (Robert Glenister), Spooks
- Margaret Blaker (Isla Blair), The Quatermass Experiment
- Alistair Frith MP (Toby Whithouse), Being Human
- The Rt. Hon. Julia Montague MP, Bodyguard
- The Rt. Hon. Hilary Rees-Benson MP, The Amazing Mrs Pritchard

=== Secretaries of Trade and Industry ===
- Basil Corbett MP, Yes Minister
- The Rt. Hon. Geoffrey Pickles MP, Yes, Prime Minister

=== Secretaries of fictional ministries ===
==== Department of Administrative Affairs ====
- Minister for Administrative Affairs, Jim Hacker MP (Paul Eddington), Yes Minister, (later Prime Minister)
- Minister for Administrative Affairs Tom Sargent MP (Robert Urquhart), Yes Minister

==== Department of Social Affairs and Citizenship ====
- Secretary of State for Social Affairs (later and Citizenship) Hugh Abbot MP (Chris Langham), The Thick of It
- Secretary of State for Social Affairs Cliff Lawton MP (Tim Bentinck), The Thick of It
- Shadow Secretary of State for Social Affairs and Citizenship Peter Mannion MP (Roger Allam), The Thick of It (later Secretary of State for Social Affairs and Citizenship)
- Junior Minister of Social Affairs Dan Miller MP (Tony Gardner), The Thick of It (later Leader of the Opposition)
- Secretary of State for Social Affairs and Citizenship Nicola Murray MP (Rebecca Front), The Thick of It (later Leader of the Opposition)
- Minister for Immigration (DoSAC) Ben Swain MP (Justin Edwards), The Thick of It
- Minister of State for Social Affairs (DoSAC) Fergus Williams MP (Geoffrey Streatfeild), The Thick of It

==== Ministry of Magic ====
- Minister for Magic Cornelius Fudge (Robert Hardy), Harry Potter
- Minister for Magic Rufus Scrimgeour (Bill Nighy) Harry Potter

==== Other fictional ministries ====
- Minister of International Commerce Sir John Dixon MP (Joss Ambler), The Black Sheep of Whitehall
- Minister with Unusual Portfolio Sir Ronald Rolands MP (Graham Crowden), Nebulous
- Minister for Silly Walks Mr. Teabag MP (John Cleese), Monty Python's Flying Circus
- Minister of Public Worship Oliver Brand MP (Labour), character in Robert Hugh Benson's novel Lord of the World

=== Other ===
- First Lord of the Admiralty Sir Joseph Henry Porter KCB MP, H.M.S. Pinafore by Gilbert and Sullivan
- Attorney General Sir Edward Leithen MP - John Macnab by John Buchan
- Minister of State for Schools Sir Horace Bradford PC MP (Raymond Huntley), The Great St Trinian's Train Robbery
- Minister for the Arts Nick Everitt MP, Yes, Prime Minister
- Deputy Prime Minister Caroline Fox MP (Cheryl Campbell), Spooks, 2006–2010
- Secretary of State for Transport The Rt. Hon. Neil Hitchcock MP, Yes, Prime Minister
- Secretary of State for Wales Geronwy Hopkins MP (Hubert Rees), The New Statesman
- Under-Secretary for Foreign Affairs Sir Ronald Masterman MP, The Five Royal Coachmen
- Secretary of State for Housing Sir Greville McDonald MP (Terence Alexander), The New Statesman (later Minister for Law and Order, Secretary of State for the Environment, MP for Devizes, Secretary of State for European Affairs and Leader of the Progressive Federalists Party)
- Minister of State for Scotland Hugh McKenzie MP, First Among Equals (later Secretary of State for Scotland)
- Secretary for European Affairs Lord Penryn, The Adventure of the Lost Holiday
- Minister of State for Health Leslie Potts MP, Yes, Prime Minister
- Minister of Housing and Planning Leslie Titmuss MP (David Threlfall), Titmuss Regained by John Mortimer (1991 TV series, sequel to Paradise Postponed 1986 series)
- Under-Secretary of Defence Adam Sutler MP, V for Vendetta
- Foreign Trade Minister Daniel Wise MP (Ian Bartholomew), Spooks
- Minister of International Trade The Rt. Hon. Christopher Waites, MP (Anthony Bate), The Saint episode "The Imprudent Politician"
- Under-Secretary for Finance Charles Wentworth MP, Spitting Image
- Henry Danby MP, IRA-assassinated minister responsible for the Long Kesh Internment Camp, whose death launches the plot for Harry's Game by Gerald Seymour (1975, televised 1982).
- Justice Secretary The Rt. Hon. Peter Laurence (Hugh Laurie), Roadkill

== Members of Parliament ==
=== House of Commons of the United Kingdom ===
==== Conservative MPs ====
- Julian Backbench-Crawler MP – Spitting Image
- Sir Anthony Backbench-Dull MP – Safe Seat-in-Surrey, Spitting Image
- Baxter Basics MP – Greyfriars Central, Viz
- Sir Stephen Baxter MP (John Nettleton) – The New Statesman (later elevated to the House of Lords)
- Richard Bellamy MP (David Langton) – Upstairs, Downstairs (later Civil Lord of the Admiralty, elevated to the House of Lords and Under-Secretary for Foreign Affairs)
- Geoffrey Booza-Pitt MP – House of Cards Trilogy (later Chancellor of the Duchy of Lancaster and Foreign Secretary)
- Alan B'Stard MP (Rik Mayall) – Haltemprice, The New Statesman (later chairman of the Conservative Party, MEP for Obersaxony, Leader of the New Patriotic Party and Lord Protector)
- Sir William Bunter MP – Greyfriars Central, Viz
- Claire Carlsen MP (Isla Blair in the TV adaptation) – House of Cards Trilogy
- Sir Anthony Childish MP – Wilmslow Garden Centre, Spitting Image
- Henry Collingridge MP (David Lyon in the TV adaptation) – House of Cards Trilogy (later prime minister)
- Victor Crosby MP (James Saxon) – Accrington, The New Statesman
- The Hon. Sir Piers Fletcher-Dervish MP (Michael Troughton) – Devizes, The New Statesman (later Junior Minister for Housing and European Commissioner for Internal Relations)
- Simon Dunn MP - Ever Decreasing Circles, The Campaign
- Sir Michael Harbour-Baker MP – Pucklebridge, First Among Equals
- Sir James Jaspers MP – Haslope West, Marvel UK (later Prime Minister)
- Simon Kerslake MP (James Faulkner in the TV adaptation) – Coventry Central, First Among Equals (later Junior Shadow Minister for Housing, Under-Secretary of State for the Home Department, MP for Pucklebridge, Shadow Minister of State for Education, Minister of State for Northern Ireland, Minister of State for Defence, Secretary of State for Defence, Shadow Home Secretary, Leader of the Conservative Party and Leader of the Opposition – also prime minister in the US version)
- Sir Eric Koops MP – Sussex Downs, First Among Equals
- Tom Makepeace MP (Paul Freeman in the TV adaptation) – House of Cards Trilogy (later deputy prime minister, foreign secretary, prime minister and an independent)
- Augustus Melmotte MP - Westminster, (David Suchet in 2001 TV adaptation) The Way We Live Now by Anthony Trollope (1875)
- Ainslie Munro MP – Edinburgh Carlton, First Among Equals
- Alec Pimkin MP – Littlehampton, First Among Equals
- The Rt. Hon. Rockasaurus MP – Birmingham Nice Part, Spitting Image
- Claud Seabrook MP (Julian Fellowes), Our Friends in the North, later Home Secretary
- Claudia Seabrook MP (Saskia Wickham), Our Friends in the North
- The Hon. Charles Gurney Seymour MP (Jeremy Child in the TV adaptation) – Sussex Downs, First Among Equals (later Junior Shadow Minister for Housing, Junior Whip, Minister of State for Trade, Financial Secretary to the Treasury, Shadow Chancellor of the Exchequer, Foreign Secretary, Home Secretary and Speaker of the House of Commons)
- Tim Stamper MP (Colin Jeavons in the TV adaptation) – House of Cards Trilogy (later Junior Whip, Chief Whip and Chairman of the Conservative Party)
- Maxwell Stanbrook MP – House of Cards Trilogy (later Secretary of State for the Environment and prime minister)
- Colonel Sir Tewkesbury MP (Bernard Archard) – Wolverton, Upstairs Downstairs
- Leslie Titmuss MP - (David Threlfall in both TV series) - Paradise Postponed and Titmuss Regained (later Minister for Housing and Planning)
- Bill Travers MP – Redcorn, First Among Equals (later Shadow Minister of Agriculture)
- Captain Clive Trevelyan MP (Timothy Dalton in ITV adaptation) – Sittaford, The Sittaford Mystery
- Aubrey Upjohn MA MP – Market Snodsbury, Jeeves in the Offing
- Francis Urquhart MP (Ian Richardson in the TV adaptation) – House of Cards Trilogy (later Chief Whip and prime minister)
- D.P. Wentworth MP – Bethwick West, The Great St Trinian's Train Robbery
- David West MP - Tooting North, Citizen Smith, series 1, episode 6 'The Hostage'
- Patrick Woolton MP (Malcolm Tierney in the TV adaptation) – House of Cards Trilogy (later Foreign Secretary)
- Julian Fawcett MP (Simon Farnaby), Ghosts

==== Labour MPs ====
- Alf Abbott MP – Coventry Central, First Among Equals
- Pandora Braithwaite MP – Ashby-de-la-Zouch - the Adrian Mole series
- David Brownlow MP (Bernard Horsfall in the 1974 TV adaptation) - South Riding
- Tom Carson MP – Liverpool Dockside, First Among Equals
- Mary Cox MP (Gina McKee), Our Friends in the North
- Bob Crippen MP (Nick Stringer) – Bramall, The New Statesman
- Agnes Fairchild MP (Barbara Ewing) - Utterley, Brass
- Andrew Fraser MP (David Robb in the TV adaptation) – Edinburgh Carlton, First Among Equals (later Under-Secretary of State for Scotland, Minister of State at the Home Office, Minister of State for Defence and Leader of the Social Democratic Party)
- Raymond Gould QC MP (Tom Wilkinson in the TV adaptation) – Leeds North, First Among Equals (later Under-Secretary of State for Employment, Minister of State for Trade, Shadow Secretary of State for Trade, Shadow Secretary of State for Social Services, Shadow Chancellor of the Exchequer, Chancellor of the Exchequer and Leader of the Labour Party – also prime minister in the UK version)
- Stephen Kendrick MP – House of Cards Trilogy
- Paddy O'Rourke MP (Benjamin Whitrow) – The New Statesman
- Jean Price MP (Penelope Keith) - No Job for a Lady
- Harry Shagboat MP – Rotherhithe, Upstairs, Downstairs
- Zilliboy Shinbags MP – Labour Party caricature in Michael Cummings political cartoons
- C.R. Spettigue MP – Bethwick West, The Great St Trinian's Train Robbery
- George Watson MP (Ian Cullen) - Gallowshield, When the Boat Comes In (later MP for Gallowshield North)
- Eddie Wells MP (David Bradley), Our Friends in the North

==== Liberal Party MPs ====
- Julia Bartlett MP - SLD MP for Bermondsey, Inspector Morse, The Infernal Serpent
- Rudolph Bead MP – Lands End South, Not the Nine O'Clock News
- The Rt. Hon. George Duggan MP (Robert Hardy) - Rye, The Duchess of Duke Street
- Sir Daniel Fogarty MP (Tom Adams) – Manchester, The Onedin Line
- Robert Onedin MP (James Garbutt), The Onedin Line
- Major Reginald Leslie Pinner MP (Roger Hammond) - Gallowshield, When the Boat Comes In

==== Tory MPs ====
- Henry Buckley Flashman MP – Ashby, Flashman series of novels by George MacDonald Fraser
- Sir Bollockstone Fletcher-Dervish MP (Michael Troughton in the TV sitcom) – Devizes, The New Statesman
- Captain Gower MP (Noel Johnson in the TV adaptation) – Truro, Poldark series of novels by Winston Graham
- Captain Ross Poldark MP (Robin Ellis in the 1975 TV adaptation, Aidan Turner in the 2015 version) – Truro, Poldark series of novels by Winston Graham

==== Other parties ====
- S. Baldrick MP (Tony Robinson) – Adder Party – Dunny-on-the-Wold, Blackadder the Third (later elevated to the House of Lords)
- Tarquin Fin-tim-lin-bin-whin-bim-lim-bus-stop-F'tang-F'tang-Ole-Biscuitbarrel MP (Michael Palin) – Silly Party – Luton, Monty Python's Flying Circus
- Charles Egremont MP – Industrial Radical Party, The Difference Engine
- John Smith MP – Standing Party – Hammersmith Palais, The Goodies Rule – O.K.?
- James Walker MP (Terry Jones) – Sensible Party – Harpenden, Monty Python's Flying Circus
- Jethro Q. Walrustitty MP (Graham Chapman) – Silly Party – Leicester, Monty Python's Flying Circus
- George Warleggan MP (Ralph Bates in the TV adaptation) – Whig – Truro, Poldark series of novels by Winston Graham

==== Unknown parties ====
- Captain Monk Adderley MP (Malcolm Tierney in the TV adaptation) – Bishop's Castle, Poldark series of novels by Winston Graham
- Nicholas Ashworth MP (Anton Lesser) – Spooks
- Thomas Baker MP (David Tomlinson) – Wormskirk, Carry on Admiral (later Principal Private Secretary to the First Sea Lord)
- Clare Ballentine MP (Eve Matheson) – The Thick of It
- Sir Talbot Buxomly MP (Denis Lill) – Dunny-on-the-Wold, Blackadder the Third
- Sir Danvers Carew MP – Strange Case of Dr Jekyll and Mr Hyde
- Stephen Faraday MP (James Wilby in ITV adaptation) – Sparkling Cyanide by Agatha Christie
- Nick Hanway MP (Martin Savage) - The Thick of It
- Harriet Jones MP (Penelope Wilton) – Flydale North, Doctor Who: "Aliens of London" and "World War Three" (later Prime Minister)
- Leslie Melbourne Chancellor (Matthew Halls) (Jaken River IV)
- Joan Littler MP (Brenda Blethyn) - Liverpool South-West, Yes Minister (later Principal Private Secretary to the prime minister)
- The Rt. Hon. St. John Murray MP – The Navy Lark
- Jeremy Renno MP (Benny Hill) – The Benny Hill Show and The Best of Benny Hill
- William Sampson MP (Rupert Graves) – Spooks
- Mr. Scrymgeour PC MP – The Adventures of Sally
- Colonel James Skinsale MP (Alan Rowe) – Thurley, Horror of Fang Rock
- Sir Henry Tomkins MP (James Hayter) – Carry on Admiral
- Unwin Trevaunance MP (Peter Clay in the TV adaptation) – Bodmin, Poldark series of novels by Winston Graham
- Maureen Watkins MP – Yes Minister
- Sir Reginald Wheelbarrow MP – The Goodies
- Hampton Wilder MP (Tim Pigott-Smith) – Spooks

=== House of Lords ===
- Lord Hampton of Wick (Kenneth Connor) – Carry On Henry (later Prince of Berkshire)
- Rupert Seymour, 15th Earl of Bridgewater – First Among Equals
- Roderick Spode, 7th Earl of Sidcup (John Turner in the TV adaptation) – Jeeves novels by P. G. Wodehouse
- Charlie Tyrell, Lord Haslemere (Christopher Cazenove) - The Duchess of Duke Street

== Mayors ==
- Mayor Margaret Blaine (Annette Badland) – Cardiff, Doctor Who episode "Boom Town"
