= List of fictional prime ministers of the United Kingdom =

The portrayals of fictional prime ministers of the United Kingdom have been either completely fictional figures, or composite figures based on real-life people, or real-life figures who have never been prime minister other than in fiction.

== List of fictional prime ministers ==
=== Named prime ministers ===
Real people on this list are marked:†

Work	Prime minister	Medium	Year(s)	Actor	Notes	References
24: Live Another Day	Alastair Davies	Television	2014	Stephen Fry	Composite of David Cameron and Boris Johnson	
31 North 62 East	John Hammond	Film	2009	John Rhys-Davies		
A Very British Coup	Thomas Andrews	Novel	1982	N/A	Harry Perkins' predecessor as prime minister, Andrews was the head of a Conservative-SDP Government of National Unity which suffered a landslide defeat to Labour in the 1989 general election. Thereafter, Andrews served as the Leader of the Opposition.	
A Very British Coup	Harry Perkins	Novel	1982	N/A	Being the target of a conspiracy orchestrated by the Civil Service, the General Staff, newspaper magnate Sir George Fison, and the United States to undermine his radical policy agenda, Perkins is ultimately forced to resign after a meltdown at a nuclear power station whose creation he supported as secretary of state for the public sector. He represented the Sheffield Central constituency. The sequel novel The Friends of Harry Perkins, published in 2019 and set forty years after the events of A Very British Coup, opens with Harry Perkins' funeral.	
A Very British Coup	Lawrence Wainwright	Novel	1982	N/A	Initially serving as chancellor of the exchequer, Wainwright was a co-conspirator in a plot to remove Harry Perkins as prime minister and stymie his legislative agenda, hoping to become prime minister himself as a result after losing out on becoming Labour leader due to an electoral college system. After Perkins' resignation, Wainwright was elected leader by a majority of Labour MPs whilst Lord President of the Council and Leader of the House Jock Steeples was declared acting leader by the Labour Party National Executive. Wainwright was appointed prime minister at the intervention of DI5. After replacing the entire Cabinet (with Steeples turning down a minor position), Wainwright abandoned Perkins' policies not already implemented, including British withdrawal from NATO, nuclear disarmament, withdrawal from the Common Market, and the dissolution of newspaper monopolies. In The Friends of Harry Perkins, it was revealed that he served for only two years before Labour fell from power.	
A Very British Coup	Thomas Andrews	Television	1988	Roger Brierley	Andrews led a Conservative majority government to a landslide defeat in the 1991 general election following a banking sector crisis brought about by revelations of misconduct uncovered by Labour leader Harry Perkins. Andrews thereafter served as Leader of the Opposition. He was mentioned as representing the Surrey East constituency, and likely succeeded Margaret Thatcher (who was mentioned by Perkins as a former prime minister).	
A Very British Coup	Harry Perkins	Television	1988	Ray McAnally	Following much of the plot of the novel, albeit opposed to nuclear power, Perkins is presented with forged evidence of financial irregularity suggesting that he accepted £300,000 from the Soviet government as part of loan negotiations with the International State Bank of Moscow, implicating his former lover Helen Jarvis. With Fison's newspapers falsely speculating on Perkins' health and suggesting overwhelming public support for Perkins's former chancellor Lawrence Wainwright (a co-conspirator) as prime minister, he uses a live national broadcast intended for the announcement of his resignation on grounds of ill health to reveal the blackmail conspiracy and to call an early general election. On Election Day morning, it is implied that a military coup has begun. He represented the Sheffield Central constituency.	
Anno Domini 2000, or, Woman's Destiny	Mrs Hardinge	Novel	1889	N/A	Imperial prime minister of a federated British Empire.	
Anno Domini 2000, or, Woman's Destiny	Lady Cairo	Novel	1889	N/A	Imperial prime minister of a federated British Empire, succeeding Mrs Hardinge.	
Back in the USSA	Enoch Powell†	Novel	1997	N/A	Said to have succeeded Anthony Eden. He serves as PM from at least 1964 (teddy Bear's Picnic) until at least 1972 (Abdication Street).	
Black Doves	Richard Eaves	Television	2024	Adeel Akhtar		
Black Mirror	Michael Callow	Television	2011	Rory Kinnear	Episode: "The National Anthem".	
Blackadder: Back & Forth	Baldrick	Short film	1999	Tony Robinson	After accidentally constructing a working time machine designed by Leonardo da Vinci so that his master Lord Blackadder could win £30,000 in a New Year's prank-cum-bet, Baldrick became the puppet prime minister to Edmund III of the United Kingdom after they used the time machine to manipulate history for their benefit.	
Bleak Expectations	Gladraeli Clampvulture	Radio	2012	Geoffrey Whitehead	In the Series 5 finale "A Loved-Up Life Potentially Totally Annihilated", he refused to assist Pip Bin in foiling Mr Benevolent's plan to destroy the universe, even after the disappearance of several towns (as none were in constituencies controlled by his party). Considering re-election to be his first priority, he agreed to help only after learning that saving the universe would be a "huge vote winner", albeit deploying an ineffective one-man British Isles Defence Force. He dies after an enraged Pip throws him into Benevolent's Universe Destroying Device (one of many bizarre and violent deaths suffered by members of the Clampvulture family). Clampvulture's unfulfilled campaign promises included votes for horses and free jam.	
Bodyguard	John Vosler	Television	2018	David Westhead	Forced to resign after a kompromat originally given to Home Secretary Julia Montague was leaked following her assassination.	
Cobra	Robert Sutherland	Television	2020	Robert Carlyle	Sutherland oversees response efforts following power outages caused by a solar flare, and has to deal with a resultant blockade of Northumberland and the drug overdose death of his daughter Ellie's best friend, which she caused. After his Home Secretary Archie Glover-Morgan attempts to orchestrate a vote of no confidence against him, he calls a general election, which he wins with a reduced majority of nine MPs. He has to contend with the aftermath of an explosion on a sunken Second World War ammunition ship and subsequent Russian cyber attacks.	
Doctor Who	Harriet Jones	Television	2005	Penelope Wilton	Episode: "The Christmas Invasion". Originally introduced as a backbench MP in the two-part story "Aliens of London" / "World War Three", the Doctor states that she would serve as a successful three-term prime minister with her premiership being regarded as a golden age, but he instigates a vote of no confidence against her as revenge for her ordering the destruction of the retreating Sycorax ship.	
Doctor Who	Harold Saxon	Television	2007	John Simm	Episode: "The Sound of Drums". Alias of The Master, an evil Time Lord and one of the Doctor's archenemies.	
Doctor Who	Jo Patterson	Television	2021	Harriet Walter	Episode: "Revolution of the Daleks": The Technology Secretary who won a leadership election and announced a rollout of Security Droids built from Daleks. However, she was immediately exterminated by a Dalek outside No.10 Downing Street.	
Doctor Who	Roger ap Gwilliam	Television	2024	Aneurin Barnard	Episode: "73 Yards". Elected in 2046 as the head of the nationalist Albion Party. Oversaw the UK's withdrawal from NATO and becoming an independent nuclear power after negotiating with Pakistan to purchase its entire nuclear arsenal. Later, his ministry oversaw the implementation of compulsory DNA testing and collation into a National Database. After an interdimensional intervention, he is succeeded as prime minister by his more liberal deputy Iris Cabriola.	
Dominion	Lord Halifax†	Novel	2012	N/A	Lord Halifax succeeds Neville Chamberlain in May 1940 instead of Winston Churchill, and it is under Halifax's premiership that Britain agrees to an armistice with Nazi Germany that leads to Britain becoming a Nazi satellite state.	
Dominion	Lord Beaverbrook†	Novel	2012	N/A	As a result of Britain entering into an armistice with Germany in 1940, Lord Beaverbrook served as prime minister in 1952, heading a collaborationist puppet government that came to power following a possibly fraudulent general election in 1950. His newspapers form part of the propaganda machine of this government.	
Doomsday	John Hatcher	Film	2008	Alexander Siddig	After being ravaged by the Reaper virus, Scotland is isolated from the rest of Britain by a 30ft wall in 2008. When cases of Reaper virus are diagnosed in London in 2035, Hatcher assembles a medical team to discover a possible vaccination after satellite imagery detects survivors on the other side of the wall. As the Reaper epidemic grows Hatcher plans to evacuate the city, but is infected during a botched assassination attempt and later ousted by conniving adviser Michael Canaris (David O'Hara). Hatcher eventually commits suicide rather than dying of the virus.	
Endymion	Sidney Wilton	Novel	1880	N/A	A prominent Whig Cabinet member who employs Endymion Ferrars as a favour to the latter's sister; eventually becomes Prime Minister when the Whigs are voted in, and later resigns in Ferrars' favour.	
Endymion	Endymion Ferrars	Novel	1880	N/A	A clerk at Somerset House and son of a failed Tory politician, Ferrars rises through the Whig party to be Secretary of State and succeeds Sidney Wilton as Prime Minister after Wilton's resignation.	
First Among Equals	Lord Broadstairs	Novel	1984	N/A	The unidentified prime minister who led Labour to a narrow general election victory in 1989 following a short-lived, ineffective Conservative minority government during Margaret Thatcher's third tenure as prime minister. Due to drastic cardiac surgery, he was forced to stand down as Labour leader in 1991 in favour of his deputy and chancellor of the exchequer, Raymond Gould; however, he continued to serve as prime minister until that year's general election. His departure from office coincided with the abdication of Elizabeth II. Lord Broadstairs is his post-prime-ministerial title.	
First Among Equals	Raymond Gould	Novel	1984	N/A	In the UK edition of the novel, following the extremely close 1991 general election, Charles III informs Conservative leader Simon Kerslake that he intends to make Labour leader Raymond Gould his first prime minister. Gould had to enter into a coalition agreement with the SDP, which included holding a referendum on proportional representation.	
First Among Equals	Simon Kerslake	Novel	1984	N/A	In the US edition of the novel, following the extremely close 1991 general election, Charles III informs Labour leader Raymond Gould that he intends to make Conservative leader Simon Kerslake his first prime minister. Kerslake's character is likely analogous with the novel's author, Jeffrey Archer.	
Gloriana, or the Revolution of 1900	Hector d'Estrange	Novel	1890	N/A	Character is a pseudonym of Gloria De Lara	
Heads of State	Samuel Clarke	Film	2025	Idris Elba	First Black British prime minister in his sixth year of premiership. A working-class graduate of Cambridge University and veteran of the British Army, he survives an assassination attempt alongside US president John Derringer as a part of a conspiracy organised by vice-president Elizabeth Kirk and Russian arms dealer Viktor Gradov to destabilise NATO.	
Henry IX	Gwen Oxlade	Television	2017	Pippa Haywood	The incumbent prime minister when King Henry IX announces his intention to abdicate in coincidence with his Silver Jubilee.	
Hostage	Abigail Dalton	Television	2025	Suranne Jones	Formerly a junior minister in the Foreign Office, Dalton's premiership is marred by military spending cuts and a lack of vital NHS drugs, leading to negotiations with France for a consignment of medication. At the Foreign Office, Dalton had ordered the withdrawal British troops during a Guatemalan invasion of Belize that resulted in civilian deaths. A group of still-resentful former soldiers kidnap her husband during his work with Doctors Without Borders and try forcing her resignation in exchange for his release, before organizing acts of terrorism and orchestrating a mass assault of the Home Secretary when she refuses. Dalton arranges her husband's rescue with French president Vivienne Toussant (Julie Delpy); after French military save him, the soldiers retaliate by murdering Dalton's father and placing a bomb in 10 Downing Street. A vote of no-confidence is passed on Dalton, believing she has become sidetracked. When the terrorists further target Dalton's family, she exposes the MoD general responsible, after which the motion of no-confidence is voided and she calls for a general election.	
Hostage	Dan Ogilvy	Television	2025	Pip Carter	Formerly the Defense Secretary, Ogilvy was appointed as interim prime minister by the Cabinet following a successful vote of no-confidence against Abigail Dalton. He responds to the bombing of 10 Downing Street by declaring a state of emergency, although he stands down in favour of Dalton after the MoD general behind the terrorist attacks is exposed and the vote if no-confidence is voided.	
House of Cards	Henry "Hal" Collingridge	Television	1990	David Lyon	Succeeding Margaret Thatcher as Conservative leader and prime minister, Collingridge leads his party to victory at the next general election albeit with a reduced majority. Citing the 'Night of the Long Knives' as precedent, Collingridge decides not to reshuffle his Cabinet. Being passed over for a promotion to the Home Office as a result, Government Chief Whip Francis Urquhart plots to replace him as prime minister out of revenge by fabricating a scandal involving Collridge's alcoholic brother and insider trading. In an ironic twist, Collingridge offers to support Urquhart's leadership bid.	
King Charles III	Tristan Evans	Film	2017	Adam James	A constitutional crisis ensues over the King's refusal to grant royal assent to a statutory press regulation bill which could allow the government to censor the news and prevent the uncovering of genuine abuses of power.	
King Ralph	Jeffrey Hale	Film	1991	James Villiers		
Late Night Mash	Keith Price	Television	2022	Josh Pugh	Due to difficulties in appointing a long-term prime minister, members of the public were randomly selected to serve in the role for two week tenures, similar to jury service. During a press conference Price, formerly a plumber from Cambridge, announced his policies of banning strawberries (as his wife was allergic), prohibiting non-regular customers at the Merchant's Arms pub in Cambridge from sitting at the bar, pursuing a Moon mission, and bombing France.	
Little Britain	Michael Stevens	Television	2003	Anthony Head	Based on Tony Blair, he is the object of aide Sebastian Love's affection.	
Little Britain	Robert	Television	2005	Matt Lucas	The chancellor of the exchequer and successor to Michael Stevens. He is based on Gordon Brown.	
Little Britain USA	Sebastian Love	Television	2008	David Walliams	Formerly an aide to Michael Stevens, Sebastian Love's affections have been transferred to the new American president. Love is a parody of Peter Mandelson.	
London Has Fallen	Leighton Clarkson	Film	2016	Guy Williams		
Love Actually	David	Film	2003	Hugh Grant		
Marvel Universe	James Jasper	Comics	1983–present	N/A	Character in Marvel Universe	
The Mouse on the Moon	Leonard Wibberley	Novel	1962	N/A		
The Mouse on the Moon	Leonard Wibberley	Film	1963	Ron Moody		
Mr Stink	Dave	TV film	2012	David Walliams	Walliams is the author of the original novel	
My Dad's the Prime Minister	Michael Phillips	Television	2003–2004	Robert Bathurst		
No Love for Johnnie	Reginald Stevens	Novel	1959	N/A		
No Love for Johnnie	Reginald Stevens	Film	1961	Geoffrey Keen		
Noughts + Crosses	Opal Falomi	Television	2020	Rakie Ayola	In an alternate timeline where Europe was colonised by several African nations, Opal Falomi is the prime minister of Albion, a self-governing colony of the Aprican Empire where racial segregation between Crosses and Noughts is rigidly enforced.	
Party's Over	Henry Tobin	Radio	2019	Miles Jupp	Tobin's disastrous eight-month premiership ended following a landslide defeat to the Opposition, the loss of his seat in a snap general election, and his unceremonious removal as party leader (later episodes imply that he lost a vote of no confidence and his party has remained in government). It is suggested he was a Conservative, having succeeded David Cameron and Theresa May and mentioned several Conservative ministers as former colleagues.	
Passport to Pimlico	Arthur Pemberton	Film	1949	Stanley Holloway	Originally a shopkeeper in Miramont Gardens, Pimlico. After it is discovered that his neighbourhood is still technically part of the defunct Duchy of Burgundy, he is appointed prime minister after a descendent of the last known duke asserts his claim and forms a privy council, with its meetings taking place in his shop. Forced to contend with strained British-Burgundian relations, owing to Burgundy becoming a safe haven for black marketeers, he ceases to be prime minister once the micro-nation is reunited with Britain.	
Phineas Redux	Mr Daubney	Novel	1873	N/A		
Phineas Redux	Mr Gresham	Novel	1873	N/A		
Red Election	Adam Cornwell	Television	2021	James D'Arcy		
Roadkill	Dawn Ellison	Television	2020	Helen McCrory	Predecessor to Peter Laurence, whose resignation cleared the way for Laurence to take over.	
Roadkill	Peter Laurence	Television	2020	Hugh Laurie	Previously the transport secretary and the justice secretary. Laurence was embroiled in numerous scandals, including two extramarital affairs, a love child, his daughter Susan being photographed taking cocaine, culpability in the deaths of several tenants in properties that he owned, and often contradicted government policy publicly. He was being investigated by journalist Charmian Pepper for his involvement with an American think tank seeking to privatise the NHS; this came to a halt following Pepper's death during a suspicious traffic collision. Laurence's premiership was jeopardised immediately, after his wife Helen refused to liquidate a shell company opened under her name.	
Secret Invasion	Pamela Lawton	Television	2023	Anna Madeley	The British prime minister who is kidnapped and impersonated by the Skrulls, she is later freed and is assassinated at a press conference at 10 Downing Street by an unknown assailant.	
Secret State	Charles Flyte	Television	2012	Tobias Menzies	Predecessor to Tom Dawkins, who dies in a suspicious plane crash while returning from the United States.	
Secret State	Tom Dawkins	Television	2012	Gabriel Byrne	Formerly the deputy prime minister to Charles Flyte, he succeeded Flyte after the latter's death. After discovering a plot to engineer a war against Iran, he calls a vote of no confidence against his own government.	
Settling Accounts: In at the Death	Horace Wilson†	Novel	2007	N/A	In an alternate timeline in which the Confederate States won the War of Secession over the United States, the Second Great War (1941–1944) in Europe witnesses the destruction of London, Norwich and Brighton (alongside Paris and Petrograd) by German superbombs. After the ousting of Prime Minister Winston Churchill and Chancellor of the Exchequer Oswald Mosley, Horace Wilson was installed as a caretaker prime minister tasked with negotiating peace with the victorious Central Powers.	
Seven Days to Noon	Arthur Lytton	Film	1950	Ronald Adam		
Sherlock Holmes	Lord Bellinger	Television	1951	J. Leslie Frith	Episode: "The Second Stain"	
Sherlock Holmes	Lord Bellinger	Television	1968	Cecil Parker	Episode: "The Second Stain"	
The Adventure of the Second Stain	Lord Bellinger	Short story	1904	N/A	Collected in The Return of Sherlock Holmes	
The Afrika Reich	Lord Halifax†	Novel	2011	N/A		
The Amazing Mrs Pritchard	Rosamund Pritchard	Television	2006	Jane Horrocks	Originally a supermarket manager from Eatanswill, Yorkshire, Pritchard stands as an independent candidate out of anger and forms the Purple Alliance, a third-way party whose members are predominantly female. Her policies including moving Parliament to Bradford, banning car usage on "Green Wednesday" (which she decided upon spontaneously), and promising to subject EU legislation to greater parliamentary scrutiny after a Lithuanian plane crashes over Walthamstow.	
The Difference Engine	Lord Byron †	Novel	1990	N/A	A member of the Industrial Radical Party, which was formed following Charles Babbage's successful development of a working Analytical Engine and the early arrival of the Information Revolution. Lord Byron became prime minister in 1831 following the Duke of Wellington's unsuccessful coup d'etat to keep the Tory government in power and subsequent assassination. Byron died in office in 1855 amidst rioting during the Great Stink.	
The Difference Engine	Isambard Kingdom Brunel†	Novel	1990	N/A	Another member of the Industrial Radical Party, Brunel succeeded Lord Byron following his death in 1855.	
The Diplomat	Nicol Trowbridge	Television	2023	Rory Kinnear		
The Final Cut	Francis Urquhart	Novel	1995	N/A		
The Final Cut	Maxwell Stanbrook	Novel	1995	N/A	Formerly the Environment Secretary, tasked with prohibiting the erection of a statue in honour of Margaret Thatcher, Stanbrook succeeded Francis Urquhart following his (elective) assassination and went on to win a landslide majority in Parliament due to public sympathy. Stanbrook was Jewish and of dubious parentage.	
The Final Cut	Francis Urquhart	Television	1995	Ian Richardson		
The Final Cut	Tom Makepeace	Television	1995	Paul Freeman	Formerly the Deputy Prime Minister and Foreign Secretary, Makepeace was fired from the Cabinet following a dispute over Urquhart's proposal of a single language for Europe. Refusing offers of demotion to Education Secretary, Makepeace began attacking Urquhart from the opposition benches and challenges him for leadership after a disastrous attempt to rally support by stirring up conflict in Cyprus. Initially planning to discredit Urquhart by leaking a tape proving his role in the death of journalist Mattie Storin, Urquhart's assassination on the day he surpassed Thatcher's time in office allows Makepeace to succeed him unopposed.	
The Further Adventures of Sherlock Holmes	Lord Bellinger	Film	1922	Cecil Ward		
The Ghost Writer	Adam Lang	Film	2010	Pierce Brosnan	Based on Tony Blair	
The Death of Grass	Lucas	Novel	1956	N/A	Following the failure to defeat the Chung-Li virus (which blights grass species including wheat and rice), Roger Buckley tells his friend John Custance that there has been a secret "palace revolution" in which Lucas has been removed as Prime Minister but is still serving in the Cabinet. Described by Buckley as a "common man's Prime Minister" with "suburban constraints and suburban prejudices and emotions", Lucas stepped down in favour of Raymond Welling to wash his hands of plans to mitigate starvation by destroying major British cities with atomic and hydrogen bombs.	
The Kidnapped Prime Minister	David MacAdam	Short story	1923	N/A	Collected in Poirot Investigates	
The Leader	Oswald Mosley†	Novel	2003			
The Madagaskar Plan	Lord Halifax†	Novel	2015	N/A		
The New Statesman	Alan B'Stard	Television	1992	Rik Mayall	In the final episode "The Irresistible Rise of Alan B'Stard", a special general election is called over British membership of the European Economic Community. Alan B'Stard, as leader of the Eurosceptic New Patriotic Party, became an extra-parliamentary prime minister, having not contested a seat and having threatened to use his party's mandate to become a dictatorial Lord Protector (after his deputy leader Paddy O'Rourke suggested that he rather than B'Stard would become prime minister as a result).	
The Palace	Edward Shaw	Television	2008	John Shrapnel	The incumbent prime minister at the time of King James III's death, the newly ascended Richard IV has an affair with his married press officer and he and the new king argue over cuts in defence spending.	
The Politician's Husband	Freya Gardner	Television	2013	Emily Watson	Formerly the Minister of State for Transport and Secretary of State for Work and Pensions, she became prime minister following her husband Aiden Hoynes's abortive leadership bid. With their marriage undermined by political scheming, public scandal, and unfounded suspicions that she was cheating on him with Secretary of State for Business, Innovation and Skills and leadership rival Bruce Babbish, they decide to remain married for political purposes, with Hoynes serving as Gardner's deputy prime minister.	
The Prime Minister	Duke of Omnium	Novel	1876	N/A		
The Queen and I	Jack Barker	Novel	1992	N/A	The leader of the People's Republican Party, Barker won the 1992 election through subliminal messaging organised by the television technicians' union. He immediately abolishes the monarchy and forces the Royal Family to live on a council estate. However, due to fulfilling expensive campaign promises Barker announced that Britain was to become part of Japan (with himself as Governor General) in exchange for the suspension of debt repayments, with Prince Edward having to marry the Emperor's daughter as part of the agreement. At the conclusion, the story is revealed to have been a nightmare, with the Conservatives under John Major winning re-election (as in real-life).	
The Queen and I	Jack Barker	Television	2018	David Walliams		
The Return of Sherlock Holmes	Lord Bellinger	Television	1986	Harry Andrews	Episode: "The Second Stain"	
The Rise and Rise of Michael Rimmer	Michael Rimmer	Film	1970	Peter Cook	Based on David Frost. Formerly a pollster and Conservative Party advisor, Rimmer became prime minister after murdering his predecessor, Tom Hutchinson. Rimmer gained dictatorial powers in a referendum after generating extreme levels of voter apathy by requiring the electorate to engage in constant postal voting and televoting on trivial or complex matters.	
The Rise and Rise of Michael Rimmer	Tom Hutchinson	Film	1970	Ronald Fraser	The leader of the Conservatives, Hutchinson follows the advice of advisor-turned-MP Michael Rimmer which he gives in pursuit of his own ulterior ambitions. Hutchinson is murdered by Rimmer by being pushed off an oil rig, who then succeeds him as prime minister.	
The Thick of It	Tom Davis	Television	2007–2009	N/A	Formerly the Transport Secretary and Chancellor of the Exchequer, he became prime minister after his predecessor's legacy programme is leaked. He would go on to lose the 2010 general election following rumours that he is mentally unwell and dependent on antidepressants. A parody of Gordon Brown, Davis is unseen throughout the series.	
The Thick of It	JB	Television	2012	N/A	The young, inexperienced prime minister of a Coalition government that took power following Tom Davis' loss of the 2010 general election and instigated austerity measures. His youth and determination to modernise the party irritate some of its longer-standing members, who looks down on JB and his "Eton clique". A parody of David Cameron, JB - like Tom Davis before him - is unseen in the series.	
The Third World War: The Untold Story	Mrs Plumber	Novel	1978	N/A	Based on Margaret Thatcher.	
The War That Came Early	Horace Wilson†	Novel series	2009–2014	N/A	In an alternate timeline in which the Second World War began in 1938 due to the assassination of Konrad Henlein by a Czech nationalist, Horace Wilson succeeded Neville Chamberlain as prime minister in 1940 (Winston Churchill having been killed by a drink-driver). As a result of his increasingly anti-democratic leadership, a relatively bloodless military coup occurred in 1941 resulting in Wilson and his Cabinet being placed in preventative detention and replaced by a military junta which respected civil liberties and voices of dissent out of expediency.	
The West Wing	Maureen Graty	Television	2005	Pamela Salem	Maureen Graty is the prime minister of the United Kingdom in 2005–2006. She deploys UK troops towards President Josiah Bartlet's Middle East peacekeeping plan in 2005 under the command of British General Whitehead.	
To Play the King	Francis Urquhart	Novel	1993	N/A	After the newly crowned king criticises many of Urquhart's policies and establishes himself as an unofficial Leader of the Opposition, Urquhart wins a majority in a snap general election, thus forcing the king to abdicate in favour of his son.	
To Play the King	Francis Urquhart	Television	1993	Ian Richardson	After the newly crowned king criticises many of Urquhart's policies and establishes himself as an unofficial Leader of the Opposition, Urquhart wins a majority in a snap general election, thus forcing the king to abdicate in favour of his son.	
Torchwood: Children of Earth	Brian Green	Television	2009	Nicholas Farrell		
Touch Me, I'm Karen Taylor	Karen	Television	2008	Karen Taylor	A "Junior Minister catapulted to power" following the deaths of most of the Cabinet due to cat flu. She does not take the job very seriously.	
V for Vendetta	Adam Susan	Graphic novel	1982–1985	N/A	A former police chief constable, he and the Norsefire Party rose to power by exploiting poverty, chaos, and panic following a worldwide nuclear war whereafter he adopted the title of Leader. A lifelong virgin and possibly repressed homosexual, Susan falls in love with the super-computer Fate after the anarchistic terrorist V manipulated it to express the emotion of love to drive Susan insane. He was assassinated by Rose Almond, widow of the head of "The Finger" Derek Almond, resulting in his lieutenants killing each other to become Leader.	
V for Vendetta	Adam Sutler	Film	2006	John Hurt	Based on Adam Susan from the original comic series. Formerly the Conservative Under-Secretary of Defence, he founded the Norsefire Party, whose supporters developed the St Mary's virus and corresponding cure, using them to perpetrate false flag attacks and win a general election, becoming personally wealthy. Sutler held the title of High Chancellor following the establishment of the Norsefire dictatorship. In exchange for the surrender of the anarchistic terrorist V, Sutler is kidnapped and executed by Creedy, the leader of the Finger (the military police).	
Whoops Apocalypse	Kevin Pork	Television	1982	Peter Jones		
Whoops Apocalypse	Sir Mortimer Chris	Film	1986	Peter Cook		
Years and Years	Vivienne Rook	Television	2019	Emma Thompson	The leader of the far-right, populist Four Star Party (named after her tactic of swearing on pre-watershed television to appeal to disaffected voters). She was the first incumbent prime minister to be arrested, charged with murder and conspiracy to murder for the establishment of so-called 'Erstwhile Sites' for the detainment of asylum seekers and economic migrants. Although incarcerated, it is implied that she escaped with the aid of powerful sponsors and was replaced with a double.	
Yes Minister	Herbert Attwell	Television	1980–1984	N/A	The unnamed and unseen prime minister throughout the original series, he is mentioned by name only in companion books for the series (his name being a portmanteau of three real prime ministers: Herbert H. Asquith, Clement Attlee and Arthur Wellesley). Attwell appointed Jim Hacker as minister for administrative affairs upon becoming prime minister in "Open Government", principally as an act of revenge against Hacker for managing his rival's leadership campaign. In "Party Games", he unexpectedly retired after his home secretary and deputy was forced to resign following a spectacular drink-driving incident; Hacker surmised that Attwell held on to the premiership only to deny it to his then likely successor. Spending his retirement writing his memoirs, Attwell's sudden death in the Yes, Prime Minister episode "A Diplomatic Incident" saw his state funeral serve as an unofficial summit, during which Hacker discussed the terms of joint British-French management of the Channel Tunnel with the French president.	
Yes, Prime Minister	Jim Hacker	Television	1986–1988	Paul Eddington	Previously the minister for administrative affairs and party chairman, Hacker became prime minister in "Party Games" after the surprise retirement of his predecessor. Hacker positioned himself as a moderate candidate after learning that the foreign secretary and chancellor of the exchequer (the likely successors following the home secretary's resignation due to drink-driving) both posed serious security risks. In companion books written as published diary entries, Hacker ceased being prime minister after leading his party to defeat at the next general election.	
Yes, Prime Minister	Jim Hacker	Television	2013	David Haig	Depicted as the leader of a coalition government during the Eurozone crisis, the series revolves around his efforts to secure a multi-trillion dollar interest-free loan from Kumranistan as a solution.	
Zenith	Peter St. John	Comics	1987–2000	N/A	Formerly known as Mandala, a member of the now-disbanded superhero team Cloud 9.	
The Death of Grass	Raymond Welling	Novel	1956	N/A	Following the failure to defeat the Chung-Li virus (which blights grass species including wheat and rice), Raymond Welling becomes Prime Minister following a "palace revolution" to mitigate starvation by destroying major British cities with atomic or hydrogen bombs. Welling escaped to Canada along with the British Government and the Royal Family after plans for the bombings leaked, sparking anarchy throughout Great Britain. He denied formulating such plans, blaming rogue elements of the Royal Air Force for carrying out recorded bombings.	

=== Unnamed prime ministers ===
Below is a list of works in which a prime minister appears, but does not receive a name.

Work	Medium	Year(s)	Actor	Notes	References
Agatha Christie's Poirot	Television	1990	Henry Moxon	Episode: "The Kidnapped Prime Minister"	
Ali G Indahouse	Film	2002	Michael Gambon		
Carry On Emmannuelle	Film	1978	Robert Dorning		
Damage	Film	1992	Tony Doyle		
Heavens Above!	Film	1963	Colin Gordon		
Harry Potter and the Half-Blood Prince	Novel	2005	N/A	referred to as The Muggle Prime Minister	
Ice	Television	2011	Simon Callow		
Lifeforce	Film	1985	Peter Porteous		
Johnny English	Film	2003	Kevin McNally		
Johnny English Reborn	Film	2011	Stephen Campbell Moore		
Mission: Impossible – Rogue Nation	Film	2015	Tom Hollander		
Mr Stink	Novel	2009	N/A		
North Sea Hijack	Film	1980	Faith Brook		
Percy's Progress	Film	1974	Harry H. Corbett		
Random Harvest	Film	1942	Edward Fielding		
Stormbreaker	Novel	2000	N/A		
Stormbreaker	Film	2006	Robbie Coltrane		
The Day of the Jackal	Novel	1971	N/A		
The Tunnel	Film	1935	George Arliss		
Water	Film	1985	Maureen Lipman		

== See also ==
- List of fictional political parties
- Lists of fictional presidents of the United States
- List of fictional monarchs of real countries
- List of fictional politicians
