= List of fictional political parties =

This is a list of fictional political parties of various countries.

== Australia ==
- Australian People's Party - The Honourable Wally Norman
- Total Country Party - The Honourable Wally Norman

== Confederate States of America ==
- Confederate Party - The Guns of the South
- Freedom Party - American Empire, Settling Accounts
- Patriot Party - The Guns of the South
- Radical Liberal Party - Great War, American Empire
- Redemption League - American Empire
- Whig Party - Great War, American Empire

== Czechia ==
- Everyone's Party (Strana všech; merger of ODS and ČSSD) - Comeback
- Sudeten Party of Solvent Russians (Sudetská Strana Solventních Rusů) - Kancelář Blaník

== Denmark ==
- The New Democrats (Nye Demokrater) - Borgen
- The Moderates (De Moderate) - Borgen
- Labour (Arbejderpartiet) - Borgen
- Green Party (Miljøpartiet) - Borgen
- Solidarity Collective (Solidarisk Samling) - Borgen
- Liberal Party (De Liberale) - Borgen
- New Right (Ny Højre) - Borgen
- Freedom Party (Frihedspartiet) - Borgen

== Finland ==
- Koti, kirkko ja isänmaa (The Home, the Church and the Fatherland) - Salatut elämät
- Totuus-puolue (The Truth Party) - Salatut elämät

== Greece ==
- Vyzantini Anagennisi (Byzantine Renaissance) Konstantinou kai Elenis

== Japan ==
- Friendship Democratic Party - 20th Century Boys
- The Restoration Party for Future - The Final Judgement
- Seiyu Party - Change
- United Future Party - Persona 5
- Green Reproduction Party - Parasyte: Part 1 and Parasyte: Part 2

== Netherlands ==
- Lijst "de snor" (list "moustache") - Kopspijkers
- Tegenpartij - Van Kooten and De Bie
- De Partij tegen de Burger ("The party against the Citizen") - De Speld

== Russia ==
- Ultranationalist Party - Call of Duty: Modern Warfare series
- Ushi Party - Empire Earth

== South Korea ==
- Great Korea Party - All About My Romance
- Green and Justice Party - All About My Romance
- Korea Peace Party - The President
- New Korea Party - All About My Romance
- New Wave Party - The President
- Progressive Labor Party - All About My Romance
- Victory Party - The City Hall

== Spain ==
- ACDC - La que se avecina

== Taiwan ==
- China National Party - Island Nation series
- Democracy Party - Island Nation series
- Democracy Peace Party - Wave Makers / The World Between Us: After the Flames
- Justice Party - Wave Makers / The World Between Us: After the Flames
- New National Party - Island Nation Series

== Turkey ==
- Devlet Millet Düzen Yüksek Parti (DMDYD) ("State Nation Order High Party") - Koltuk Belası
- Destek Partisi (Assistance Party) - Zübük
- Liberal Muhafazakar Komünist Parti (Liberal Conservative Communist Party) - İllegal Hayatlar

== Ukraine ==
- Servant of the People - Servant of the People (the star, Volodymyr Zelenskyy, was elected president of Ukraine in reality in 2019)

== United Kingdom ==
- Adder Party - Blackadder the Third
- Albion First! - Command & Conquer
- Albion Party - Doctor Who episodes 73 Yards and Empire of Death
- Bald Brummies Against The Big-Footed Conspiracy Party - Knowing Me, Knowing You... with Alan Partridge
- Black Shorts - Jeeves series by P. G. Wodehouse
- Bouncing Party - The Goodies Rule – O.K.?
- birthday party
- British Republic Party - Avalon by Stephen R. Lawhead
- The British Way - "Spooks"
- Brotherhood of British Freemen ("Greenshirts") - Point Counter Point by Aldous Huxley
- Comfy Sweaters Lets Not Be Too Hasty Party (CSLNBTHP) - Spitting Image
- Common Sense Party - Something Rotten, Party's Over
- Conservation Party - The Beiderbecke Affair
- Conservationists, Democrats and Socialist Workers' Party — Shadowrun (London sourcebook)
- Conservative-Labour Party and Labour-Conservative Party — the Rumpole novels of John Mortimer.
- Darkie Power Party - "Election Night Special" episode of Monty Python's Flying Circus
- David Owen Party (parody of the reformed SDP) - Spitting Image
- English Nationalist Party (far-right, pro-Brexit party) - The Friends of Harry Perkins
- English Socialist Party - Nineteen Eighty-Four
- Four Star Party (populist, far-right party) - Years and Years
- Fight Dutch Elm Disease and Build More Houses Party (fringe party) - Terry and June
- Government Party - Ali G Indahouse
- Industrial Radical Party - The Difference Engine by William Gibson and Bruce Sterling
- Keep Royalty White, Rat Catching And Safe Sewage Residents' Party - Blackadder the Third
- Little Bit of Politics Party (LBP) - Spitting Image
- Max Walling Party - The Goodies Rule – O.K.?
- McKenzie Square Dancing Party - The Goodies Rule – O.K.?
- Monarchists - TekWar
- National Bocialist Party (led by Mr. Hilter) - from Monty Python's Flying Circus
- National Socialist Party of Britain - The Bill
- New Patriotic Party (merger of Eurosceptic factions of the Conservatives and Labour parties) - The New Statesman
- Norsefire - V for Vendetta
- People's Party - Hercule Poirot short story The Augean Stables
- The Progressive Federalists (merger of the pro-EU factions of the Conservatives and Labour parties) - The New Statesman
- Purple Alliance - The Amazing Mrs Pritchard
- Reform Party - In the Red and sequels by Mark Tavener
- Roundheads - TekWar
- Saxon Party - Doctor Who episodes "The Sound of Drums" and "The Last of the Time Lords" (mentioned in others).
- Sensible Party - "Election Night Special" episode of Monty Python's Flying Circus
- Silly Party - "Election Night Special" episode of Monty Python's Flying Circus
- Silver Shirts - American Empire, Settling Accounts
- Slightly Silly Party - "Election Night Special" episode of Monty Python's Flying Circus
- Socialist Labour Party - The New Order: Last Days of Europe
- Standing at the Back Dressed Stupidly and Looking Stupid Party - from Blackadder the Third
- String 'Em Up Party (SEU) - Spitting Image
- Stone Dead Party - "Election Night Special" episode of Monty Python's Flying Circus
- Tooting Popular Front - Citizen Smith
- Twig Party (a Third Way party “combining the best aspects of both” the Tories and Whigs; the name "Whory" was rejected outright) - Bleak Expectations Series 2, Episode 3 "A Recovery All Made Miserable"
- United Democratic Party (merger of anti-Treaty of Berlin factions of the Conservatives and Labour) - Dominion
- United England - The New Order: Last Days of Europe
- United Kingdom Racist Party - Fags, Mags and Bags Series 1, Episode 6 "January February"
- Very Silly Party - "Election Night Special" episode of Monty Python's Flying Circus
- Victus (radical, pro-living, anti-zombie party) - In the Flesh
- Waltzing Party - The Goodies Rule – O.K.?
- White Monarchy Death off the Road Slitty Eyes Go Home Gas Badgers Pull Your Finger Out Party - Spitting Image
- Why Can't My Son Get A Decent Job Rather Than Nancing Around with A Group of Pansies on Saturday Superstore Party (in an alliance with the White Monarchy Death off the Road Slitty Eyes Go Home Gas Badgers Pull Your Finger Out Party) - Spitting Image
- Women Against Nylon Knitware - Hamish and Dougal
- Wood Party - from Monty Python's Flying Circus Series 1, Episode 12 "The Naked Ant"

== United States of America ==
- All-Night Party - Marvel Universe, but also a real-life frivolous political party
- American Freedom Pool Party - Animaniacs
- After Party - suggested by Greg Gutfeld
- ASS Party - Antisocial Socialist Party (mascot: ostrich with head in a [corn]hole)
- American House Party - Animaniacs
- America Now Party - The Dead Zone
- American Socialist White People's Party (also called the "Illinois Nazis") - The Blues Brothers
- American Survivalist Labor Committee - American Flagg!
- Anal Compulsive Party - Dave Barry Slept Here: A Sort of History of the United States
- Bipartisan Party - Death Race 2000
- Blacks' party - O Presidente Negro
- The Clean US Party (CUSP) - Infinite Jest
- The Church of Scientology (as a fictional political party) - Dave Barry Slept Here: A Sort of History of the United States
- Common Ground Party (a parallel universe's Democratic Party) - Mathematicians in Love
- Corporatist Party (nicknamed 'Corpos') - It Can't Happen Here by Sinclair Lewis
- The Del-Vikings - Dave Barry Slept Here: A Sort of History of the United States
- The Eternal Man Party - The World's Greatest Sinner
- Free Watoga People's Party - Fallout 76
- Gallatinist Party - The Probability Broach by L. Neil Smith
- God's Lightning Party - The Illuminatus! Trilogy by Robert Shea and Robert Anton Wilson
- Grange Party - The Iron Heel by Jack London (loosely based on the real Grange movement)
- Haiku Party - Dave Barry Hits Below the Beltway
- Heritagist Party (a parallel universe's Republican Party) - Mathematicians in Love
- The Home Boys - Dave Barry Slept Here: A Sort of History of the United States
- Humans First Movement - Marvel Cinematic Universe
- Independence Party - The Two Georges by Harry Turtledove and Richard Dreyfuss
- Jeffersonian Party - It Can't Happen Here by Sinclair Lewis and Warrior Class by Dale Brown
- Libertarian Immortalist - Schrödinger's Cat trilogy
- Liberty Party (a far more extreme version of the Republicans) - Coyote by Allen Steele
- Meadow Party - Bloom County
- Men's Party - O Presidente Negro
- Marxist League (actually the name of several Communist groups, though not in the USA) - Bill Bailey (Ultimate Sectarian) by Joe Glazer and Bill Friedman
- The National Surrealist Light People's Party - Not Insane or Anything You Want To by The Firesign Theatre
- New Federalist - Kingdom Come by Elliot S. Maggin
- The New Founding Fathers of America - The Purge
- New Morality - Grand Tour series by Ben Bova
- Party of Girls - Barbie
- People's Ecology Party - Schrödinger's Cat trilogy
- Pink Party - Pinky and the Brain
- Prehistoric Zucchini Party - Dave Barry Hits Below the Beltway
- Propertarian Party - The Probability Broach by L. Neil Smith
- Ralph Nader Party - Dave Barry Hits Below the Beltway
- Royalty Party - Emperor of America by Richard Condon
- Surprise Party - Animaniacs
- The Replacement Party - Nashville
- The Sharks - Dave Barry Slept Here: A Sort of History of the United States
- Surprise Party - Gracie Allen's attempt to run for President in the 1940 presidential election as a publicity stunt
- Survivalist Party - Ecotopia by Ernest Callenbach
- Super American America Party - Animaniacs
- Third Wing Party - Marvel Comics
- Tomorrow Party - DC Comics
- U.S. Christian Conservative Party - Rama II
- United States First Party - Tom Clancy's Op-Center by Jeff Rovin
- Wing Nut Party - Dave Barry Hits Below the Beltway
- Women's Party - O Presidente Negro

== Other, unknown, or fictional countries ==
- The Founders - in BioShock Infinite is only political party for the citizens in Columbia.
- Advance - The left-populist ruling party of Territory One in Not for Broadcast.
- Aemonkian Communist Party - the sole ruling party of the fictional communist country of Aemonkia in the Dead or Alive series
- Animalism - in George Orwell's Animal Farm
- Communist Party of Arstotzka - the sole ruling party of the fictional communist country of Arstotzka in Papers, Please
- Death-Worship - in Eastasia, George Orwell's Nineteen Eighty-Four
- Fist of Allah Party - in Jordan, from Command & Conquer
- Government Democratic Party - The First President of Japan
- Horst Schlämmer Party - Germany, in Horst Schlämmer – Isch kandidiere!
- Human Renaissance Party - in the High Republic of Heldon, in Norman Spinrad's The Iron Dream
- Hynkel Party - the ruling Nazi-styled fascist party of Tomainia in The Great Dictator
- Independent Future Party - Red Dwarf episode Mechocracy, run by Kryten and Dave Lister
- Interspecies Reviewers
  - Orc Party
  - Demon Party
  - Succubus Party
- Lovely Fluffy Liberal Alliance Party - Red Dwarf episode Mechocracy, run by Arnold Rimmer and Cat
- M.I.S.T. - in Dead or Alive video game series.
- Napaloni Party - the ruling party of Bacteria, styled on Italian fascism.
- Nazty Party - Ruling party of Moronica in You Nazty Spy! and I'll Never Heil Again
- Neo-Bolshevism - in Eurasia, George Orwell's Nineteen Eighty-Four
- New Apathetic Party - Canada, in Royal Canadian Air Farce
- South Park
  - Allied Atheist Alliance
  - United Allied Atheists
  - Unified Atheist League
- Taschist Party - Ruling party of Borduria in The Adventures of Tintin
- UN Party - in Japan, in Killer7
- The Irish Republican Party - Command & Conquer
- Left Party, Middle Party and Right Party - parties in the sequel of Blindness, by José Saramago, Seeing.

=== Monty Python's Life of Brian ===
- Judean People's Front
- People's Front of Judea
- Judean Popular People's Front
- Campaign for a Free Galilee

=== Foundation series ===
- Actionist Party - Made by opponents of Salvor Hardin
- Democratic Underground Party - Resistance movement against first the Indbur dynasty, and then the Mule

=== Futurama ===
Earthican Government:

- Antisocialists
- Brainslug Party
- Bull Space Moose Party (cf. Bull Moose Party)
- Dudes For the Legalation of Hemp
- Fingerlicans (pun on Republicans)
- Green Party (members are literally green)
- National Raygun Association (pun on the National Rifle Association, though not actually a political party)
- One Cell, One Vote
- People for the Ethical Treatment of Humans (pun on People for the Ethical Treatment of Animals)
- Rainbow Whigs Party
- Tastycrats (pun on Democrats)
- Voter Apathy Party

=== Honorverse ===
- Centrist Party - Star Kingdom of Manticore
- Citizen Rights Party - People's Republic of Haven
- Conservative Association - Star Kingdom of Manticore
- Constitutional Progressive - Republic of Haven
- Corporate Conservative - Republic of Haven
- Crown Loyalists - Star Kingdom of Manticore
- Legislaturists - People's Republic of Haven
- Liberal Party - Star Kingdom of Manticore
- New Conservative - Republic of Haven
- New Democrat - Republic of Haven
- New Men Party - Star Kingdom of Manticore
- Progressive Party - Star Kingdom of Manticore

=== Star Wars expanded universe ===
- Centerpoint Party - Corellia
- Human League - Corellia
- Loyalists - Galactic Republic
- Rationalist Party - New Republic
- Rights of Sentience Party - New Republic
- Centrists - New Republic
- Populists - New Republic
- Separatists - Galactic Republic

=== Star Trek expanded universe ===
- Jaridan, Nej'ahar, Jol Tan, and Suketh Coalitions - Romulan Star Empire (Star Trek: The Next Generation Role-playing Game)

== See also ==
- List of fictional politicians
- List of fictional U.S. Presidents
- List of fictional British monarchs
- List of fictional British Prime Ministers
- List of frivolous political parties
