= Tegenpartij =

The Tegenpartij (Counterparty, but also opponent) was a Dutch fictional political party, founded in 1979 by the Dutch comedic duo Van Kooten en De Bie. They played the characters Jacobse and Van Es, two vrije jongens (free guys, literally), played by respectively Kees van Kooten and Wim de Bie. Jacobse and Van Es were originally two scoundrels, who eventually founded their own political party: The Tegenpartij. They described it as the party for all Dutchmen who can no longer stand the Netherlands.

Van Kooten and De Bie were trying to fight the populist tendencies of some of the other parties with their parody, but things turned out a bit differently: the Tegenpartij became so popular that it might well have gained several seats in parliament if it had actually taken part in elections. The party was finally 'disbanded' on May 10, 1981, just before the elections. In a final sketch, characters Jacobse and Van Es were shot and killed while single-handedly attempting a coup at the Binnenhof, the center of Dutch politics.

== Quotes ==
From the party platform

- Stemp de Tegenpartij! (Vote Counterparty!) The word "stemp" is an Urban Haguenese pronunciation of "stem", meaning "vote"
- Samen voor ons eigen (Together for ourselves)
- Geen gezeik, iedereen rijk (No whining, riches for all)

Jacobse en Van Es

- Mogen wij éven overgeven? (May we please vomit now?)
