= Mathematicians in Love =

2006 novel by Rudy Rucker

- First edition
- Author: Rudy Rucker
- Cover artist: J. P. Fruchet
- Language: English
- Genre: Science fiction
- Publisher: Tor Books (USA)
- Publication date: December 2006
- Publication place: United States
- Media type: Print (hardback)
- Pages: 364
- ISBN: 0-7653-1584-X (first edition, hardback)
- OCLC: 64442767
- Dewey Decimal: 813/.54 22
- LC Class: PS3568.U298 M38 2006

Mathematicians in Love is a science fiction novel by American writer Rudy Rucker.

== Plot summary ==
Bela and Paul are working towards their Ph.Ds under the direction of a mad math genius named Roland Haut, they invent a para-computer called "GoBubble" that predicts the future. They are both involved in a love triangle with Alma.

== Reception ==
Publishers Weekly in their review said that "Rucker cleverly pulls off a romantic comedy about mathematicians in love" and that "While most of the mathematical flights may stun hapless mathophobes, Rucker's wild characters, off-the-wall situations and wicked political riffs prove that writing SF spoofs, like Bela's rock music avocation, "beats the hell out of publishing a math paper." Carl Hays in his review for Booklist said that "in a riotously twisting plot, complete with hypertunnels, alien shellfish from a parallel universe, and an improbable resolution to the threesome’s romantic dilemma, Rucker pulls out all the stops for one of his most entertaining yarns to date."
