= List of fictional monarchs of real countries =

This is a list of fictional monarchs – characters who appear in fiction as the monarchs (kings, queens, emperors, empresses, etc.) of real-life countries. They are listed by country, then according to the production or story in which they appeared.

== A ==
=== Australia ===
Queen of Oz

- Princess Georgiana of the fictional British royal family, played by Catherine Tate, becomes the monarch after her mother unexpectedly abdicates the Australian throne in favour of her scandalous daughter, hoping to send her as far away from London as possible and make her someone else's problem.

=== Austria-Hungary ===
A Scandal in Bohemia by Sir Arthur Conan Doyle

- Wilhelm Gottsreich Sigismond von Ormstein – The Grand Duke of Cassel-Felstein and the hereditary King of Bohemia, he approaches Sherlock Holmes and Dr. Watson about the retrieval of letters and photographs confirming a liaison with Irene Adler in order to secure his engagement to Clotilde Lothma Von Saxe-Meiningen, a young Scandinavian princess.

== C ==
=== China ===
Mulan

- An unnamed Emperor is the wise, old ruler of China who makes Fa Mulan an honorary heroine for saving him and his empire from the Huns, in Disney's animated film Mulan and its live-action remake, which based on the legendary folklore about Hua Mulan. His literary basis might be Emperor Taiwu of Northern Wei.

The Mummy: Tomb of the Dragon Emperor

- Emperor Han (portrayed by Jet Li) was a Chinese warlord who succeeded in becoming the first Emperor of China. However, his quest for immortality ultimately led to his being cursed and entombed. He was later resurrected but was defeated by Rick O'Connell and his son before he could extend his reach to enslave the Earth.

== D ==
=== Denmark ===
Hamlet by William Shakespeare

- King Hamlet was the previous monarch of Denmark and the father of Prince Hamlet. His ghost appears at night and beckons his living son to follow his instructions. He is loosely based on Horwendill, the legendary Jutish chieftain.
- King Claudius poisoned his brother King Hamlet to become the new monarch of Denmark and to be married to Queen Gertrude, Prince Hamlet's mother. He is loosely based on the Jutish chieftain Feng.

== F ==
=== France ===
Memoirs of the Twentieth Century by Samuel Madden

- Louis XIX reigns over a France weakened by war in a 1990s where the Jesuit order has considerable influence over European politics; Louis' prime minister is a Jesuit who exerts such influence over him.

The Short Reign of Pippin IV by John Steinbeck

- Pippin Arnulf Héristal, a descendant of Charlemagne, is crowned as Pippin IV to provoke a rebellion.

== I ==
=== Inca Empire ===
The Adventures of Tintin

- Prince of the Sun from Prisoners of the Sun
  - The reigning prince who rules the Sun-worshipping Inca Empire in the fourteenth volume of the Tintin comics. He resides in the hidden Temple of the Sun deep within the Andes mountain range where he meets Tintin and Captain Haddock sent by a Peruvian boy named Zorrino. The Prince also appears in the animated film adaptation, Tintin and the Temple of the Sun, where he is the father of Princess Maita.

The Emperor's New Groove

- Emperor Kuzco
  - He is the young, selfish, and callous ruler of the Inca Empire who loves to dance to the groove every morning but has a sense of style and charm. Kuzco befriends a farmer and llama herder, Pacha, and eventually learns the meaning of friendship and generosity after he was transformed into a llama by his former advisor and self-proclaimed sorceress Yzma (who attempted to poison him to claim the throne for herself) and her muscular but somewhat dimwitted henchman Kronk Pepikrankenitz. His name is a reference to the ancient city of Cusco.

=== India ===
Charlie and the Chocolate Factory by Roald Dahl

- Prince Pondicherry wants to rule India in his own chocolate palace, rejecting Willy Wonka's warning to eat it all before it melts. But despite his insistence, the prince's chocolate palace later melts on the hot sunny day. His name derives from the city of Pondicherry.

=== Iraq ===
Iznogoud

- Haroun El Poussah is a benevolent and benign caliph of Baghdad who Iznogoud serves as his grand vizier and who only cares about sleeping, eating and having lazy fun. His name is a pun on the historical Caliph Harūn al-Rashīd.

=== Italy ===
Romeo and Juliet by William Shakespeare

- Prince Escalus is the reigning prince of Verona. He is possibly based on Bartolomeo I of the Scaliger family.

The Tempest by William Shakespeare

- King Alonso is the monarch of Naples and the father of Prince Ferdinand.

== J ==
=== Japan ===
The Tale of Genji by Murasaki Shikibu

- The Kiritsubo emperor
- Emperor Suzaku [ja], the Kiritsubo emperor's son and immediate successor
- Emperor Reizei [ja], Suzaku's successor and supposedly also a son of the Kiritsubo emperor but secretly a son of the protagonist, Hikaru Genji

== T ==
=== Thailand/Siam ===
The King and I

- King Mongkut is the sovereign of Siam who is resided in the Grand Palace in Bangkok with his son Prince Chulalongkorn and other young royal children. Mongkut takes his request to British schoolteacher Anna Leonowens to tutor his children.

== U ==
=== The United Kingdom, England, Scotland and Ireland ===
Anno Dracula series by Kim Newman

- Dracula, who defeats his adversaries, marries Queen Victoria, and seizes control of Britain in Anno Dracula. He becomes first Prince Consort, and subsequently Lord Protector.
- King Victor I in The Bloody Red Baron. The King is the real life Prince Albert Victor, Duke of Clarence and Avondale, Queen Victoria's grandson and the second in the line of succession to the British throne from his birth in 1864 until his death in 1892.

Blackadder

- Richard IV of England (and XII of Scotland), a fictionalized version of Richard of Shrewsbury, Duke of York (one of the Princes in the Tower), played by Brian Blessed. He reigned from 1485 to 1498, succeeding his 'kind and thoughtful' uncle, Richard III. However, Henry Tudor erased Richard IV's reign, the Yorkist victory during the Wars of the Roses and Richard III's true nature from history after his belated succession to the throne. The regnal number for Scotland would be I in real-life, and this is also the Jacobite name for Rupprecht of Bavaria.
- Edmund the Blackadder, Richard IV's second son and the Duke of Edinburgh. He began a campaign to become King after being told by three witches that he would so (having been mistaken for Henry Tudor). After being mortally wounded from torture, he rules as King for thirty seconds after the entire court accidentally drank poisoned wine (which the Blackadder also drank).
- Prince Ludwig the Indestructible, played by Hugh Laurie, killed Queen Elizabeth I and her court, which included Lord Blackadder, Lord Melchett, Lord Percy and Nursie, and disguised himself as the Queen, presumably continuing until the Queen's official death.
- When Edmund Blackadder Esq. and George, the Prince Regent swap identities in order to get the latter out of a duel with the Duke of Wellington, Blackadder is saved by a cigarillo case presented by Wellington as a gift and the Prince Regent is shot by Wellington for impertinence when he reveals the ruse. The Prince Regent dies (although he first believed that he himself was saved by a cigarillo case but realized that he left it on the dresser) and Blackadder goes on to reign as George IV after George III mistakes him for his son.
- Edmund III of the United Kingdom, played by Rowan Atkinson, became king in Blackadder: Back & Forth after using a time machine to alter history. He is married to Queen Marian of Sherwood and has installed Baldrick as a puppet prime minister after dissolving Parliament.

Books by Michael Moorcock

- Gloriana I of Albion is the reigning monarch in Gloriana, or the Unfullfill'd Queen. She is Moorcock's antithesis of Queen Elizabeth I in this homage to Edmund Spenser's The Faerie Queene and Mervyn Peake's Gormenghast trilogy of novels.
- King Hern VI of Albion is Gloriana I's father, a despot with echoes of Elizabeth I's father, King Henry VIII (deceased before Moorcock's novel opens).

Code Geass: Lelouch of the Rebellion

- Charles zi Britannia (voiced by Norio Wakamoto)
  - The 98th Emperor of the Holy Britannia Empire and father of the main character, Lelouch Lamperouge. He installs his children in important positions in the Empire to see their true abilities. He views equality as an evil that must be dispelled and encourages social battle to maintain evolution within the society. As such, he publicly supports inequality and calls for competition and fighting so as to create progress.
- Lelouch vi Britannia (voiced by Jun Fukuyama)
  - The 99th Emperor of the Holy Britannia Empire, as well as the titular character of series. When Lelouch ascended to the throne during, he quickly abolished many policies that grew during the Charles' reign. These include the abolishment of aristocratic system, financial conglomerates, and the liberation of colonies. This led to discontent, and thus, agents and loyalist to Emperor Lelouch routinely goes and put down dissidents.

Headlong by Emlyn Williams

- John II: The actor Jack Green (born John Albert Sandring), who is grandson of Prince Albert Victor via a secret morganatic marriage and made king after the royal family is killed in a dirigible accident during George V's Silver Jubilee in 1935. After delivering his first Christmas Speech, in which he called on the Government to undertake radical action to reduce unemployment and thus overstepped his role as a constitutional monarch, he is forced to abdicate.
- William V: Originally William Millingham, is the private secretary of John II, and as the descendant of Queen Charlotte of Wurttemberg, becomes the new king after John's abdication.

Henry IX

- In the 2017 TV series Henry IX, King Henry IX of the United Kingdom is played by Charles Edwards. After his older brother, John, died in a horse riding accident, Henry became heir apparent to the British throne, becoming King in 1992. After nearly twenty-five years on the throne, he experiences a midlife crisis (owing to his lack of agency both in becoming and being King, his unhappy marriage and a monotonous series of trivial public engagements) and intends to abdicate during his Silver Jubilee. Queen Katarina (played by Sally Phillips) stymies his plan by clandestinely leaking it to the press, wishing to remain Queen. After Alastair, the Prince of Wales, comes out as gay and creates a succession crisis (since no one other than the homophobic Duke of Cumberland would willingly become monarch), Henry IX retains the throne. However, almost immediately, his secret relationship with the royal florist is uncovered by the tabloid press.

King Ralph

- The unnamed King of the United Kingdom (portrayed by Tim Seely) is electrocuted to death in a photography accident, along with the entire royal family.
- Ralph of the United Kingdom (portrayed by John Goodman) was an American lounge singer who came to the throne following the royal family's demise. One of the late family's princes, the Duke of Warren, had an affair with an American woman, which resulted in the birth of Ralph's father.
- Cedric of the United Kingdom (portrayed by Peter O'Toole) took power after Ralph abdicated the throne to apologize for his actions as king.

Nation by Terry Pratchett

- After influenza kills the entire British royal family, Governor Fanshaw is the heir to the throne and is sought out in the South Pacific. His daughter Ermentrude Fanshaw ("Daphne") is his heir and succeeds him on the throne and becomes queen.

The Palace

- King James III
- King Richard IV, son of James III, played by Rupert Evans.

The Royals

- King Simon Henstridge (portrayed by Vincent Regan) dies in Season 1.
- Prince Cyrus Henstridge, Duke of York (portrayed by Jake Maskall) briefly succeeded Simon after his son, Robert, is thought to have been killed in a plane crash and his twin children Prince Liam and Princess Eleanor were deemed illegitimate.
- King Robert Henstridge (portrayed by Max Brown) succeeded his father after revealing himself to be alive.

== See also ==
- List of monarchs of fictional countries
- List of fictional politicians
- List of fictional prime ministers of the United Kingdom
- List of fictional nobility
- List of fictional political parties
- Lists of fictional presidents of the United States
- List of fictional princes
- List of fictional princesses
- List of fictional dictators
