= Anno Domini 2000, or, Woman's Destiny =

1889 novel by Julius Vogel

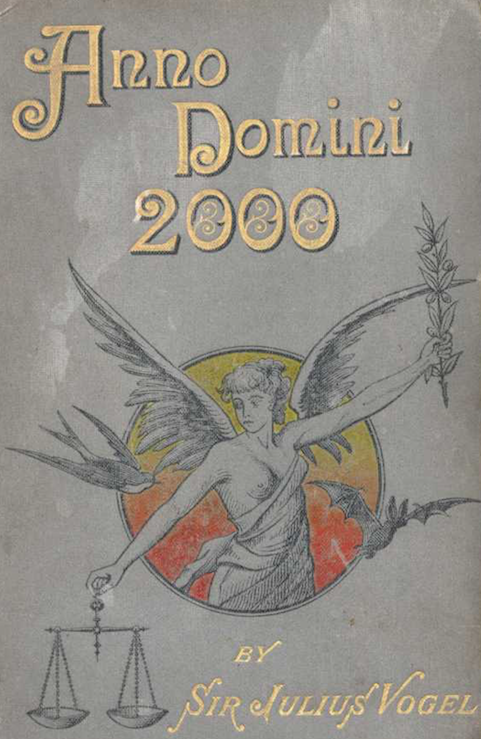
- Author: Sir Julius Vogel
- Language: English
- Genre: Science fiction
- Published: 1889
- Publication place: New Zealand

Anno Domini 2000, or, Woman's Destiny (1889) is often referred to as New Zealand's first science fiction novel. It was written by former Prime Minister of New Zealand Sir Julius Vogel while he was in England. It anticipated a utopian world where women held many positions of authority, and in fact New Zealand became the first country to give women the vote, and from 1998 to 2008 continuously had a female prime minister, while for a short period (2005–2006) all five highest government positions (queen, governor-general, prime minister, speaker of the House and chief justice) were simultaneously held by women.

== Plot summary ==
The novel describes the exploits of Hilda Fitzherbert, a 23-year-old Undersecretary for Home Affairs in a future where the British Empire has achieved both female suffrage (which New Zealand granted in real life in 1893) and become an Imperial Federation, which also included Belgium and coastal territories along the English Channel. However, Sir Reginald Paramatta, a villainous Australian republican, has his eyes set on the abduction and wooing of Miss Fitzherbert. Miss Fitzherbert foils the Republican plans and falls in love with Emperor Albert, the dashing young ruler of the Federated British Empire.

Unfortunately, their plans hit a snag when the Emperor refuses the hand of the female US president's daughter, which precipitates an Anglo-American war, which the Empire wins, leading to the dissolution of the United States, its reabsorption into the Empire, and the ensuing marriage of Hilda and the Emperor. Several years later, the Emperor and his Empress find that their opinions about male primacy in royal succession have reversed themselves, when faced with a brilliantly competent princess and bookish, scholarly prince as prospective heirs apparent to the throne.

== Reception ==
Literary scholar Roger Robinson has described Anno Domini 2000 as "that unenviable kind of book that many have heard of [in New Zealand] but almost no one has read". His 2002 edition of the novel was published with the tagline, "The Utopian Novel That Got the Future Right".

It has attracted posthumous recognition for its uncanny representation of New Zealand's female-dominated political, judicial and corporate executive hierarchies in 2000. It was reissued in 2001, and the University of Hawaii Press published its first American edition in 2002. An ebook version was published in 2013 by Hurricane Press with a retrospective chapter describing the origins of the book and the early newspaper reviews.

== Editions ==
- Sir Julius Vogel: Anno Domini 2000 Or A Woman's Destiny: Auckland: Longman: 1889.
- Sir Julius Vogel: Anno Domini 2000 Or A Woman's Destiny: Auckland: Exisle: 2001: ISBN 0-908988-16-8
- Sir Julius Vogel: Anno Domini 2000 Or A Woman's Destiny: Honolulu: University of Hawaii Press: 2002: ISBN 0-8248-2501-2
- Sir Julius Vogel: Anno Domini 2000 Or A Woman's Destiny: New Zealand Electronic Text Centre. Full text freely available online
- Sir Julius Vogel: Anno Domini 2000 Or A Woman's Destiny: Cambridge, New Zealand: Hurricane Press: 2013: ISBN 978-0-9876636-1-0 (ebook version with retrospective review)
