= The Difference Engine =

1990 alternative history novel by William Gibson and Bruce Sterling

- Cover of first edition (hardcover)
- Author: William Gibson and Bruce Sterling
- Language: English
- Genre: Alternate history, steampunk
- Publisher: Victor Gollancz Ltd
- Publication date: September 1990
- Publication place: United States
- Media type: Print (hardback and paperback)
- Pages: 383 pp (paperback – 429 pages)
- ISBN: 0-575-04762-3
- OCLC: 21299781

The Difference Engine (1990) is an alternative history novel by William Gibson and Bruce Sterling. It has been described as an early work of the steampunk genre, and is regarded as having helped to establish that genre's conventions.

It posits a Victorian-era Britain in which great technological and social change has occurred after the mechanical computers of Charles Babbage make widespread impact, there and globally, resulting in historical individuals taking on markedly different roles (Lord Byron instead surviving the Greek War of Independence to lead Britain, the late Prime Minister Benjamin Disraeli instead becoming a tabloid writer, etc.), and European and American continents of markedly different political dispositions (e.g., the United States being, rather, several competing nations). Behind the manifest progress, Kirkus writes, "20th-century crises brew", providing context for a "cops-and-robbers plot".

The novel received nominations for several major science fiction awards in the years following its publication. It has been the subject of continuing scholarly interest for its approach to history and particular historical characters, and for its relationship to the Disraeli novel, Sybil.

== Background ==
The Difference Engine is a fictional work of alternative history (alt history), what Kirkus describes as a "Victorian alternate history". It has been assigned to the genre of steampunk, and has been described as an early such work. The novel "takes the reader to London in 1855 where an Industrial Revolution unlike any seen in a history book is in full swing". Matt Mitrovich, writing for AmazingStories.com, describes it—rather than as a novel—as being a "collection of three short stories and several snippets at the end all connected by a box of punch... cards [Engine cards]...", narrated in those stories by a distinct trio of historically repurposed or purely fictional POV characters:

- First, Sybil Gerard, daughter of an earlier executed Luddite agitator (drawn into a conspiracy involving an alt history Sam Houston, here a "Texian" exiled and in London);
- Second, the esteemed "savant" paleontologist and alt history discoverer of Brontosaurus, Edward "Leviathan" Mallory, a victim of serial attacks to lay claim to a parcel of world-changing importance, oddly entrusted to him; and
- third, a fictional representation of Laurence Oliphant, as in real world, still a spy and diplomat, but introduced as Mallory's protector, continuing in the final story to investigate the early events of the book.

== Plot ==
=== First Iteration: The Angel of Goliad ===
In 1855, Sybil Gerard, daughter of an executed Luddite leader and going by the name Sybil Jones, is a dolly-mop targeting upper-class men. She is recruited by Mick Radley, secretary to Sam Houston, to support Houston's cause in Britain. Mick carries a set of 'kino cards' encoding visuals for Houston's upcoming presentation and a case of punch cards that purport to encode a betting system, or 'modus'. Before one of Houston's speeches, Mick has Sybil send the case of punch cards to Paris.

Houston steals Mick's kino card set to remove Mick's leverage over him, and Mick enlists Sybil to steal them back again. Sybil distracts the hotel concierge by composing a confrontational telegram to Charles Egremont, an MP and a former lover, in his presence while Mick obtains the key to Houston's hotel room. Sybil, acting alone, gains access to the room and finds a Texian assassin lying in wait to kill Houston. He interrogates Sybil, and murders Mick when he enters the room. Later, the Texian attacks Houston when he arrives, wounding him, damaging his raven-headed cane, and ruining the kino card set Houston has tucked in his waistband. The assassin escapes. Sybil finds large diamonds hidden inside Houston's hollow cane and departs for Paris alone, with tickets taken from Mick's dead person. It is indicated that Houston survives the assassination attempt.

=== Second Iteration: Derby Day ===
Edward Mallory, a palaeontologist and explorer, is visiting his friends participating in a gurney race derby. There, he encounters Lady Ada Byron being accosted by a man and a woman. After Mallory fights the man and woman over their treatment of Lady Byron, she gives Mallory a case containing punch cards and returns to her family. The man, fashioning himself 'Captain Swing', threatens to 'destroy' Mallory unless he returns the punch cards. As part of his attempts, Swing begins spreading rumours that Mallory was responsible for the death of his rival, Rudwick. Mallory hides the case of punch cards in the skull of the exhibit of the dinosaur he discovered, the Brontosaurus.

=== Third Iteration: Dark Lanterns ===
Laurence Oliphant meets Mallory to offer him police protection. Oliphant argues Rudwick died as a result of a conspiracy and Mallory could be the next target, as both had received sponsorship for their research work in return for supplying arms to Native American tribes to check the expansion of the United States. Mallory agrees to Oliphant's offer after he is tailed and attacked in the street. With the help of Andrew Wakefield, Oliphant's contact at the Central Bureau of Statistics, Mallory identifies Florence Bartlett, the woman he saw accosting Lady Byron at the derby. It is suggested that Bartlett brought the case of punch cards that Sybil Gerard had sent to France back to England. Mallory sends Lady Byron a letter which reveals where the case of punch cards is hidden. 'The Stink', a major episode of pollution in which London is covered by an inversion layer (comparable to the London Smog of December 1952), causes much of London's elite to leave. Mallory is accompanied around the city by Ebenezer Fraser, a secret police officer, but Fraser is wounded by looters as civil order begins to break down.

=== Fourth Iteration: Seven Curses ===
Mallory leaves Fraser at the police station and meets Hetty, a dolly-mop who knew Sybil. Mallory spends the night with Hetty in Whitechapel. The next morning, order has collapsed further, and Mallory makes his way back to the Palace of Palaeontology. On the way, he notices advertisements, commissioned by Swing, claiming Mallory murdered Rudwick and decrying the excesses of the rule of savants. After meeting his brothers at the Palace and hearing that their sister's engagement was broken thanks to rumours spread about her infidelity by Swing, Mallory gathers them and a recovered Fraser to attack Swing. They infiltrate Swing's location, finding communists from Manhattan there. After recognising Florence Bartlett as a lecturer among them, Mallory and his group starts a fight with them. They manage to hold off until rain ends the Stink and a river ironclad fires at Swing's location. Fraser apprehends Swing.

=== Fifth Iteration: The All Seeing Eye ===
A year later, Oliphant pursues his investigations into the disorder accompanying The Stink, while having persistent visions of an all-seeing eye. He identifies a dead Texian, poisoned by Bartlett, as the assassin responsible for murdering Mick Radley and Rudwick. After the Prime Minister, Lord Byron, dies during the Stink and is replaced by Brunel, Charles Egremont has begun eliminating old associates in an effort to hide his past as the one who betrayed Sybil Gerard's father to his death. Florence Bartlett is informed by Lady Byron of the location of the long-sought case of Ada Byron's cards. With a crew, Bartlett attempts to steal the cards, but is thwarted, and dies in a firefight with soldiers and policemen as she attempts to escape. Oliphant, secretly having secured the cards, uses Wakefield's help to acquire the telegram that Sybil had sent Egremont. Oliphant confronts Wakefield, who is clearly fearful, and their discussion reveals that as a part of their efforts on behalf of state security, the two of them have had individual identities of those deemed enemies fully erased from records, and thus from a history of existence. Oliphant heads for Paris to meet with French intelligence, and to meet Sybil, intending to get testimony with which to blackmail Egremont. Oliphant's meeting with his French counterpart reveals that the case of punch cards, when sent to Paris, was run through France's equivalent Engine by a 'clacker', causing it to malfunction. After meeting and persuading Sybil that his cause is dedicated to their mutual safety, Oliphant returns to London, but falls ill; his Japanese protege next appears, to the good humor of the recipient, and presents Egremont with a communique, presumably the testimony of Sybil, via Oliphant. Ada, Lady Byron delivers a lecture in France, the narrator there describing her as "The Mother". She is chaperoned by Fraser; Sybil, who attends Ada's lecture, seeks her out afterward, addresses her with undue familiarity, and after giving offense, expresses sympathy for her challenges, and gives her a gift of a ring, bearing a large, uncut diamond. Frasier and Ada return to their apartments, take stock of their finances, contemplate their next speaking tour, and in a moment of vulnerability, Lady Byron asks if the familiar insults of Sybil actually characterise who she is; Frasier responds, no, Ada, you are "La Reine des Ordinateurs"" (The Queen of Computers, or "of Machines"). Using a reflection in a mirror as the point of segue, the narrative shifts to 1991, where a vast Engine is now described as simulating the lives of all of humankind in London.

== Characters ==
- Sybil Jones / Sybil Gerard, POV narrator in the First Iteration, daughter of an executed Luddite leader and so with a hidden past, recruited by one to assist Sam Houston's cause, her aim of becoming a "prentice adventuress" shortshrifted, but ending with her en route to Paris with Sam Houston's Texian riches.
- Mick Radley, an ill-fated schemer, Sybil's recruiter, secretary to Sam Houston in the First Iteration, assisting Houston in his cause to return to Texas to raise an army, seeking to capitalize on his possession of two sought-after punch card sets, one of kino-cards, the other purportedly for a gamblers "modus".
- Sam Houston, an alt historical, fictional representation of the historic character, still a warrior, in the FIrst Iteration, a "Texian" now exiled and in London, and perceived to have absconded with Texian riches;
- Edward "Leviathan" Mallory, POV narrator introduced in the Second Iteration, esteemed "savant" paleontologist and alt history discoverer of Brontosaurus, pursued and attacked in Iteration Three to attempt retrieval of the parcel with which Mallory is entrusted; in Iteration Four, he takes the battle to Swing in his headquarters.
- Laurence Oliphant, an alt historical, fictional representation of the historic character, still a spy and diplomat, introduced as Mallory's protector in the Third Iteration, and continues as the POV narrator in the Fifth to pursue investigations into earlier events in the book.

The characters of Sybil Gerard, her father, Walter Gerard, Charles Egremont, and Mick Radley are borrowed from Benjamin Disraeli's novel Sybil. Sterling has reported that the novel's Michael Godwin character was named after attorney Mike Godwin, as thanks for his assistance in linking Sterling and Gibson's computers, allowing their collaboration between Austin and Vancouver.

== Reception ==
=== Awards and recognition ===
The novel was nominated for the British Science Fiction Award in 1990, the Nebula Award for Best Novel in 1991, and both the John W. Campbell Memorial Award and the Prix Aurora Award in 1992.

=== In review ===
In a non-contemporaneous review, Matt Mitrovich, writing for AmazingStories.com, describes The Difference Engine as "a rich and imaginative glimpse at a world dealing with the opportunities and pitfalls that come with advanced technology", describing it as written in "superb prose [that] helps paint a gritty, but believable setting", and applauding the novel's presentation of realistic, flawed characters, and the authors' "amazing depth of knowledge about the culture and technological capabilities of the era".

=== In scholarship ===
The novel has attracted the attention of scholars. Jay Clayton explores the book's attitude toward hacking, and its treatment of Charles Babbage and Ada Lovelace. Herbert Sussman argues that in The Difference Engine, Gibson and Sterling rewrite Benjamin Disraeli's novel Sybil. Brian McHale relates this work to postmodern interest in finding a "new way of 'doing' history in fiction."

=== In popular culture ===
The 1993 video game The Chaos Engine (released as Soldiers of Fortune in the USA) was based on The Difference Engine.
