= Soul music (disambiguation) =

Soul music is a musical genre.

Soul music may also refer to:

- Soul Music (novel), a 1994 Discworld novel by Terry Pratchett
- Soul Music (TV series), a 1997 British animated series based on the novel
- Soul Music (radio series), a British music documentary series
- Soul Music, a 2002 album by Woody Rock of Dru Hill
- Soul Music, a 2012 book by Candace Allen
