= Death (Discworld) =

Fictional character in Discworld series

- Discworld character
- Death as illustrated by Paul Kidby in The Art of Discworld.
- First appearance: The Colour of Magic (1983)
- Last appearance: The Shepherd's Crown (2015)
- Created by: Terry Pratchett
- Portrayed by: Marnix van den Broeke
- Voiced by: Peter Serafinowicz; Christopher Lee; Wendell Pierce; Ian Richardson; John Rowe; Michael Kilgarriff; Stephen Thorne; Rob Brydon; Nigel Planer; Stephen Briggs

In-universe information
- Alias: Bill Door (in Reaper Man)
- Species: Personification of Death
- Gender: Generally depicted as male
- Affiliation: Azrael (superior); Albert (manservant); Death of Rats (fellow personification); Death of Fleas (fellow personification)
- Weapon: Scythe
- Children: Ysabell (adoptive daughter)
- Relatives: Mort (son-in-law); Susan Sto Helit (granddaughter)

Death is a fictional character in Terry Pratchett's Discworld series and a parody of several other depictions of the Grim Reaper across Europe. He is a black-robed skeleton who usually carries a scythe and on occasion a sword for dispatching royalty. His jurisdiction is specifically the Discworld itself; he being only a minion of Azrael, the Death of all things across the Universes – in much the same way as the Death of Rats is an infinitesimally small part of Death himself.

Pratchett explores human existence through his depiction of death, which becomes more sympathetic throughout the series as it progresses.

Death almost never kills anyone or anything, but — acting in the form of a psychopomp — he merely ensures that when lives come to an end, they move on to where they believe they should go if they are sentient, which often involves a desert to be crossed.

== Works ==
Death appears in every single Discworld novel — to greater or lesser degree — except for The Wee Free Men and Snuff. In some of the novels, he is just a momentary humorous aside, whereas in others he has a more significant bearing on a plot point.

The character of Death evolves over the progression of the novels, developing more across the earlier books with his character gradually stabilising in later ones.

Death is the leading or an important central character in the following — in which he goes through significant character development — and these are considered to be the Death strand novels:

- Mort — 1987
- Reaper Man — 1991
- Soul Music — 1994
- Hogfather — 1996
- Thief of Time — 2001

== Character ==
The books represent Death's hollow, peculiar voice with unquoted small caps — since as a skeleton, he has no vocal cords — and his words seem to enter the head without involving the ears. Pratchett wrote that his voice was like two slabs of granite rubbing together, or the slamming of coffin lids. These descriptions became frequent in later novels.

Death is not invisible, but most people's brains refuse to process who he is unless he insists. Generally, only magical people like witches and wizards, children, and cats can allow themselves to see him. Death can ignore things like walls because he is eternal and things that last mere centuries are not as real as he is. He can also adjust time for himself and others nearby.

Wizards, witches, and other significant figures like kings are collected by Death himself rather than by some lesser functionary such as a scrofula. Death himself must collect some minimum number of souls, to keep the balance. His selection from ordinary deaths is worked out by a system called the "nodes" possibly based on the showiness of the death. A common thief incinerated by a dragon might qualify for example. He has shown up for at least two kittens, a swan, and a red flower-like sea creature. These events are usually of incidental importance within the story, so Death's appearance may be considered an in-joke rather than a plot device. He sometimes appears for characters in mortal peril. Rincewind has seen him on numerous near-fatal occasions. Similarly, in Thud!, Vimes has a near-death experience, for which Death appears, sitting in a deckchair reading a mystery novel as he waits to see if Vimes will die.

He is fond of cats, who can see him at all times (he seems particularly furious when he once attends to a sack of drowned kittens), and curry, the consumption of which he describes as like biting a red-hot ice cube. Being a skeleton with no digestive organs, it is not revealed how he is able to partake of food and drink. Anyone who dines with him tends to become extremely focused upon their own meal, and merely notices Death's plate being full one moment and empty the next. He occasionally smokes a pipe, with the smoke drifting out of his eye sockets. He pays for goods and services with an assortment of copper coins, many turned blue or green with age, which he says he acquired In pairs.

Death is fascinated by humanity. His interest is coupled with bafflement: it's a favorite point of Pratchett's that the habits and beliefs that are grown into instead of being rationally acquired are an essential part of being human. As Death is an outside observer, his imitations of humanity are intricate but marked by a fundamental lack of comprehension. When acting as a stand-in for the Hogfather (a figure similar to Santa Claus) he starts by greeting the children with Cower, brief mortals from force of habit until reminded not to do so. He is especially intrigued by humanity's ability to complicate their own existence, and their ability to actually get up in the morning without going insane from the sheer prospect of what life entails (from his perspective).

This fascination with humanity extends to the point of sympathy towards them, and he will often side with humans against greater threats, notably the Auditors of Reality. He has on a number of occasions bent the rules to allow a character extra life (e.g., the little girl rescued from the fire in Reaper Man, or the Little Match Girl in Hogfather). Death has also indicated that he will oblige dying humans by playing a game with them for their lives, much like the personification of Death in The Seventh Seal; the games he offers include chess, though he consistently has trouble remembering how the knights move, and another game (referred to by Death as "Exclusive Possession" in the book, presumably based on Monopoly), which the challenger lost despite having "three streets and all the utilities". Granny Weatherwax was able to play cards against Death in a successful bid to save a child's life, Granny's hand having four queens while Death's had only four "ones". (A hand of four aces would generally beat a hand of queens in poker, but Death chose to consider them low, giving the old witch a "wink" in the process.)

In the same way that his granddaughter, Susan, has been described as "Helpfulness Personified" in terms of her personality, Death, by his own admission, could very well be described as 'Duty Personified' in terms of personality; in Hogfather, in a discussion with Albert, Death comments If I had a first name, 'Duty' would be my middle name. He does not cause people to die, nor does he concern himself with their goodness or badness in life; it is simply his job to collect their souls at the appointed time.

In many ways, he epitomizes the bleakness of human existence. In Reaper Man, in which he is rendered temporarily mortal (or at least the imagination of being mortal, since his state of being "it/death" is, as mentioned in Discworld Noir, constant), he becomes frustrated and infuriated with the unfair inevitability of death, a theme that continues through later books. In Soul Music he expresses misery at the fact that he is capable of preventing deaths but is forbidden to do so; during his time as the Hogfather, he uses his new dual role to save a little match girl from dying of the cold by employing a loophole through giving her the gift of a future, thus allowing him to avoid the usual complications that arise from his breaking the rules. Despite his general lack of emotion, the Auditors of Reality are one of the few things actually capable of angering him. He also gets angry upon hearing of Rincewind: In Eric, for example, his eyes turn red at the mention of Rincewind. Pratchett even says in The Art of Discworld that he has received a number of letters from terminally ill fans in which they hope that Death will resemble the Discworld incarnation — he also says that those particular letters usually cause him to spend some time staring at the wall.

Death has developed considerably since his first appearance in The Colour of Magic. In this, he was quite a malicious character and followed Rincewind around wanting him to die after circumstances resulted in Rincewind missing his scheduled appointment. At one point he even deliberately stops a character's heart, though later in the book it was shown to have been the actions of Death's stand-in, Scrofula. By the time of Mort he had gained the sympathetic and humorous personality he has in later books. In later novels he has been used to examine developments in theoretical physics as, being supernatural, he is able to witness such events firsthand although, being a cat lover, he is not fond of the Schrödinger's cat thought experiment, believing it cruel to the cats involved.

== Home ==
Death resides in an extra-dimensional realm called Death's Domain. His home there is a Victorian house with a well-tended garden in shades of black and a skull and crossbones motif. Its name is "Mon Repos", (Quirmian means "my rest"), and it is much larger inside than outside. Death has not mastered scale, not understanding real distance nor perspective either, so its surroundings are blurred and seem distant. Death adds a large golden wheat field to the grounds after the events of Reaper Man. A tree swing he built for his granddaughter Susan, swings through the trunk of the tree.

The doors reach a height of several yards yet are only a few feet tall. He has a bathroom which he never uses, with a bar of bone-white, rock-hard soap and a towel rack with hard towels, not knowing that towels are soft and should be foldable. Plumbing confuses him, and the pipes are completely solid. He never sleeps and has a violin he tries to play. He notes in Soul Music that he can only play "an empty chord," the sound made at the end of everything to signify no more sound.

Death's house is full of cats. He also sends cats to heaven where Maurice encounters Death.

== Death's gender ==
The initial books did not pronounce themselves about the sex of Death, using the pronoun "it", although Ysabell called him 'Daddy'. In Mort, Death's pronoun is given as "he" and "his" without the special capital as in the earlier books. Also, when he goes to an employment agent, the agent refers to him as "Mister …", unable to recall his name to start. In Reaper Man, Death is unambiguously identified as a male, and in Soul Music and Hogfather Susan calls him her grandfather or "Granddad". When asked to describe Death, in the second Discworld computer game, the protagonist Rincewind hazards a guess, "Well, I suppose he's a man. You have to look at the pelvis, don't you?" In the comic strip adaptation of Mort, Death is seen in mirrors as a black-bearded human wearing a black cloak, a look he takes when he needs to be seen by the living.

Many languages must provide a grammatical gender to each object, and 'death' is often a feminine noun. As such, translations of early novels sometimes refer to Death as a woman. This is generally changed, by the time of Reaper Man. Also, the personification of Death varies from country to country leading to further confusion; for example the Russian personification is that of an old woman, while the Czech version uses for his name a normally nonexistent masculine variant of the feminine word for death. Explanations are given in footnotes, often with a pun. (Note: For example, the French translator, Patrick Couton, justified the fact by a pun in a footnote: "La Mort est un mâle, car c'est un mal nécessaire" (Death is male (mâle) because death itself is a necessary evil (mal).))

== Relations and associates ==
Death is both the servant and a part of the Old High One known as Azrael, the Death of Universes and ruler of all deaths.

In earlier books and also Thief of Time Death works with War, Pestilence, and Famine, three other Horsemen of the Apocalypse. Like him they have grown more human than required. "Form defines function", Death explains in Thief of Time, where Kaos, the Fifth Horseman, left the group before it became famous to work as a milkman under the name Ronnie Soak, before reuniting with the other Horsemen at the end.

=== Lord Mortimer, Duke of Sto Helit ===
Mortimer — shortened to Mort (but also 'death' in French and the fictional Quirmian) and so linking him to his master, Death — is the title character in the fourth Discworld novel, Mort. Mort is described as being very tall and skinny, with muscles like knots in string. He has a shock of bright red hair, and walks as if he is made entirely of knees. He is first seen as the over-thoughtful son of a farmer in the Octarine Grass Country, near the Ramtops. Having proved himself unworthy as a scarecrow, he is chosen by Death to be his apprentice.

Mort starts off at the bottom, learning to accept his position while mucking out the stables, and trying to ignore Ysabell, Death's adopted daughter. When Death feels in need of a break, Mort is charged with taking over The Duty. Unfortunately for Mort, his feelings for Keli, the teenage princess of Sto Lat get in the way of his job, and he starts off a chain reaction of events by interfering and impulsively preventing her assassination. Reluctant to tell his master about his complete gaffe, Mort tries various, more and more extreme, unsuccessful methods to rectify the situation. This culminates with taking Keli out of the Disc, whereupon Death brings the fiasco to an end. After fighting a duel with Death and losing to his master, Mort is given an extra lease of life when the Grim Reaper chooses to turn over his Lifetimer, thus allowing Mort to stay in the world of the living.

At the end of the events of Mort, Mort leaves Death's service and marries Ysabell. The couple are given the titles of Duke and Duchess of Sto Helit. Later, they become the parents of Susan Sto Helit. They subsequently meet their end after a freak accident that sends their carriage plunging into a ravine, as revealed in the opening of Soul Music. They had discussed this with Death and had turned down his offer to extend the duration of their existence on the ground that it would not be the same as actually lengthening their lives.

In The Light Fantastic, Rincewind overhears Twoflower teaching the Four Horsemen of the Apocalypse — Death, Famine, Pestilence and War — how to play bridge. At one point, War refers to Death as Mort, but it is later revealed that the only people in the room (other than Twoflower), were Death, Famine, Pestilence, and War. The name is probably the reason as to why Death chose Mort as his apprentice.

In the Cosgrove Hall animation of Soul Music, Mort is voiced by Neil Morrissey. In 2004, BBC Radio 4 adapted Mort, with the title character being voiced by Carl Prekopp.

Mort is included in Wayne Barlowe's Barlowe's Guide to Fantasy.

=== Lady Ysabell, Duchess of Sto Helit ===
Ysabell is the adopted daughter of Death who saved her life when she was a baby after her parents died in the Great Nef Desert. Why he did so is uncertain. "He didn't feel sorry for me, he never feels anything ... He probably thought sorry for me" Ysabell says. When first encountered she is as a sixteen-year-old girl with silver hair and silver eyes who, it transpires, has been sixteen for 35 Discworld 'years'; since no time passes in Death's Domain.

Ysabell first appears in a brief cameo role in the second Discworld novel, The Light Fantastic, Her encounter with Rincewind is flamboyant enough to make him believe she is 'bonkers' and she is surprised to learn that he is not dead. This state of affairs might not have continued long if the Luggage had not intervened.

When Mort first encountered Ysabell, he got the impression of "too many chocolates" (though Pratchett notes that he would have described her as 'Pre-Raphaelite' if he had ever heard the word). She also has a fixation on the colour pink. Until Mort's arrival, she just shared Death's home with Albert the manservant. During the events of the fourth Discworld novel, Mort, it became clear that Ysabell was competent in the family business, including 'The Duty' and 'doing the nodes'. This mainly involved figuring out which deaths needed to be attended to personally, an important aspect of all reality.

Ysabell marries Mort and becomes ennobled as the Duchess of Sto Helit at the end of Mort, but does not enjoy a long life as she is killed with her husband in an accident at the opening of the 14th Discworld novel, Soul Music, to be succeeded by their infant daughter, Susan.

BBC Radio 4 adapted Mort in 2004, Clare Corbett voiced Ysabell.

=== Lady Susan, Duchess of Sto Helit ===
Susan Sto Helit was Mort and Ysabell's daughter and only child. When she first appeared as a schoolgirl in Soul Music, Susan had, at age sixteen, just inherited the duchy on the death of her parents. During her upbringing, her parents had hidden her background from her and brought her up to be logical, so it comes as a shock when the Death of Rats and Quoth the Raven come looking for her. She had to act as a stand-in for Death when he disappeared, but subsequently returned to her education. Although she inherited all of her grandfather's abilities (despite being technically unrelated, as genetics work differently on the Discworld), she longed to be normal, and got human jobs, first as a governess in Hogfather, and then as a schoolteacher in Thief of Time. Death constantly dragged her back into his world. At the end of Thief of Time, she begins a relationship with Lobsang Ludd, the anthropomorphic personification of Time.

=== Albert ===
Albert is Death's manservant, butler, and cook, was originally the noted wizard and founder of Unseen University, Alberto Malich. He attempted to gain immortality by reciting backwards a ritual to summon Death, the Rite of AshkEnte, believing this would force Death to stay away from him; instead it brought him directly to Death's Domain. Since time does not flow in the same way in Death's Domain as it does on the Discworld, Albert succeeded, in a way, in gaining immortality. Before he returned to the world in Mort when he is first encountered, Albert had 91 days, three hours, and five minutes of time left on the Disc, most of which he spent shopping and using the soap and baths at the Young Men's Reformed Cultist of the Ichor-God-Bel-Shamharoth's Association (Death is not very good at plumbing). After Soul Music, he had only a few seconds left, and could no longer leave Death's Domain. Albert was a highly idiosyncratic cook, who believed everything needed to be fried to get rid of the germs, including porridge.

The founder's statue of Alberto in a hallway of Unseen University was inscribed, (apart from the usual student scribbles), with: "We shall not see his like again". This turned out to be entirely wrong. After the statue was destroyed at the end of Mort when Albert decides it is a poor likeness of him, the wizards believed that the returned Albert was in fact the statue come to life, and it was suggested that a new one be built in a very secure place — such as the dungeon, allegedly to prevent it being defiled by students. Alberto Malich was a powerful wizard, perhaps the most powerful a wizard could be. This was why he so easily devised a spell to slow the passage of time indefinitely around a small area, a near-impossible feat with Discworld magic.

When Death went missing in Soul Music, Albert tried to find him on the Disc, but got robbed and his life-timer was broken. After this incident, Albert had approximately 34 seconds left, and thus could no longer return to the world of the living, as Death cannot make his life longer. The remaining sand was kept in a bottle in Albert's bedroom. Albert was able to temporarily return to the Discworld during the events of Hogfather, although merely in the pseudo-reality that allowed the Hogfather to travel around the entire world in a single night, and hence not actually in the world, strictly speaking.

Albert's childhood was touched upon lightly in Hogfather. He came from a very poor family, even by the standards of Ankh-Morpork. This novel also suggested that he was fond of pork pies with mustard and sherry.

While Death and Albert got on rather well, it was a fragile relationship. In Mort, Albert returned to the world to help Death, but seemed ready to attack him when it looked like he had his former job as Archchancellor back. He also seemed not to trust Death with his life-timer, and took it with him in Soul Music, although Death later reflected that the action was pointless, as he would never have done anything to it. Albert frequently found himself trying to keep Death "on course" when his master became too human. He and Susan did not get on very well.

=== Binky ===
Binky is Death's steed, so named by Death because it is "a nice name". He is a living horse. Death tried a skeletal steed, but kept having to "stop and wire bits back on". Death also tried a fiery steed, but it repeatedly set his barn and his robe on fire.

Binky is rather more intelligent than most horses and is absolutely pure milky white. He can fly by just creating his own ground-level, and travel through time and across dimensions, sometimes leaving glowing hoofprints in his wake, but in all other respects is a perfectly ordinary horse. He is well-treated, and loyal to his master and Susan. He is shod by Jason Ogg, a Lancrastian blacksmith of mythical skill. Binky is not immortal, but while in Death's service does not age. Binky gained some of his powers by sharing one of Death's qualities: being so much "realer" than ordinary things such as walls, great distances, or time that he can simply ignore them.

Death gave Susan a "My Little Binky" gift set for her third birthday. It was returned by her parents, who feared that it would make her a less "normal" child.

=== The Death of Rats ===
The Death of Rats, also known as the Grim Squeaker, is not, strictly speaking, a personification in his own right but rather an aspect of Death, allowed an independent existence. His purpose is to usher on the souls of dead rodents, and assist Death in other ways. His jurisdiction also seems to cover certain kinds of "ratty" humans, such as Mr Clete in Soul Music, Mr Pin in The Truth, and Mr Pounder in Maskerade.

He was one of a disparate multitude of death-personifications created during Death's absence in Reaper Man. The Death of Rats fought and refused to be reabsorbed into Death himself upon the latter's resumption of his duties, and Death kept him around for company. The Death of Fleas also escaped resorption, but was not seen after Reaper Man. The Death of Rats resembles a murine skeleton walking on its hind legs, wearing a black robe, and carrying a tiny scythe, since his form took shape from the latent form of Death in Reaper Man, and he came into existence in the vicinity of Death's alter ego, Bill Door.

The Death of Rats finds ways around the rules more easily than Death, and assisted Susan in Soul Music, Hogfather, and Thief of Time. He sometimes travels with a talking raven named Quoth, who acts as his translator.

The Death of Rats, like Death, speaks in small caps, but has a vocabulary consisting of words such as Squeak, Eek, Ik, and Snh when he laughs, although his speech could be interpreted from context in the same way as the Librarian's.

In the mythology of the Changeling Clan of talking rats in The Amazing Maurice and his Educated Rodents, the Death of Rats was known as the Bone Rat.

=== Quoth ===
Quoth is a talking raven who accompanies the Death of Rats. He was named Quoth by his previous owner, a wizard with no sense of humour attempting to make a joke by referencing the famous line in "The Raven" by Edgar Allan Poe — but Quoth refused to give in to this stereotype by saying "the N word" ('nevermore'). At times, he acts as steed and interpreter for the Death of Rats. He has a constant craving for eyeballs and frequently (and hopefully) mistakes various other small round objects for eyeballs, such as olives and walnuts. He was originally one of the ravens from Unseen University's Tower of Art, the magical properties of which gave him his ability to speak.

He was first seen in Soul Music, then appeared in all novels involving Susan Sto Helit. Neil Pearson voiced him in the Sky One adaptation of Hogfather.

=== New Death ===
The New Death appeared in Reaper Man when he came to collect the old Death, then known as "Bill Door". The New Death was the old Death's replacement as a result of the plot by the Auditors of Reality to rid the world of sloppy thinking.

The New Death came from human belief, but was quite different from the original, having been formed by modern Discworlders who thought of death as malevolent rather than a simple cessation of life. Though he had the usual black robe, he was larger and had only smoke beneath his robe rather than bones, and wore a crown to the disgust of the original Death. He rode the classic skeletal steed, in contrast to the special, but very real Binky. Instead of a scythe he wielded a weapon "which may, at some point in its evolution, have incorporated aspects of a scythe, in the same way a scalpel incorporated aspects of a stick". In place of a face or skull, the new Death had just his crown and was prideful, dramatic, cold, and cruel, the literal embodiment of humanity's fear of death. He chose to arrive exactly at midnight and appeared in a flash of lightning purely for the dramatic effect, which the old Death found degrading and rather excessive. When he cornered Bill Door, he mocked and beat him instead of finishing the job.

Bill Door was disgusted and horrified by the New Death's callous attitude toward humanity, and his victory is the triumph of the compassionate "reaper man" over a tyrant who has no care for the harvest. The new Death was destroyed by Bill Door using the scythe he used on the farm; a humble garden tool, not the infinitely sharp implement of Death, but sharpened by his rage and the harvest.

== Rite of AshkEnte ==
The Rite of AshkEnte — also written as Ashk'Ente or Ash'Kente — was an ancient magic ritual that summoned and bound Death in a circle and prevented him from leaving until invited to do so by the summoning wizard. This may have been wishful thinking on the part of the wizards as, in Eric, Death appeared outside the circle, behind the wizards, and in Reaper Man a wizard commented that he believed Death only stayed in the circle for the look of the thing. The Rite is not tuned to Death himself, but rather to whoever happened to be performing his duties — Mort (then as Death's apprentice) was almost forced to respond to the summons, until Ysabell's intervention, and Susan Sto Helit (his granddaughter) was summoned and subsequently bound in The Hogfather. The rite does not appear to apply to Death himself, although he may just appear out of politeness.

Since Death was professionally involved in almost everything going on everywhere, the Rite was usually performed to question him on otherwise inexplicable phenomena. This was usually done only when all other avenues were exhausted, as most powerful wizards were quite old and therefore unwilling to attract the attention of Death. Death hated being summoned, because he was always summoned at the "worst possible time", such as when at a party.

The Rite also caused Albert's affiliation with Death; while he was still Archchancellor of Unseen University, Albert attempted to become immortal by performing the Rite backwards, reasoning that this would banish Death from him, but instead it transferred Albert to Death's realm, where he decided to remain on the grounds that time did not pass in Death's realm and he was thus essentially immortal.

There were twelve ways to perform the Rite, but eight of them caused instant death, and might summon Death in the "usual" manner, and the ninth is very hard to remember. This left three ways to safely summon death: Although the Rite could be performed by a couple of people with three small sticks and 4 cc of mouse blood, or even with a fresh egg and only two small sticks, the wizards (Ridcully excepted) preferred to do it the old fashioned way, with heavy equipment consisting of numerous drippy candles, octograms on the floor, thuribles, and similar paraphernalia. They felt it was not "proper" wizardry if it wasn't showy enough.

The Rite has been used several times In the Discworld books:

- In The Light Fantastic, Death was summoned to be asked about the recent mass wave of magic that had apparently done nothing, revealing that the Octavo had taken action to prevent the eighth spell dropping off the Disc so that all eight spells could be used to prevent the imminent destruction of the world. Death later returned to collect one of the high-ranking wizards present at the Rite as his time had run out. The wizard, realising his time was near, locked himself in a room sealed both magically and physically against all ills. A later book notes that doing so probably made him more likely to be found by Death.
- In Mort, Albert, briefly returned to the world, summoned Death, who was having a holiday, to let him know that Mort, his apprentice, was doing a terrible job as his replacement. It almost summoned Mort instead.
- In Eric, Death was asked about an occult disturbance that turned out to be Rincewind. Death appeared outside of the binding octogram and walked into it only at the insistence of the gathered wizards.
- In Reaper Man, when Death was forced to retire by the Auditors, an Auditor appeared in Death's place to inform the wizards of the situation and when they asked about the sudden abundance of life force, assured them that 'normal service' would resume shortly.
- In Soul Music, when Death had again taken a break from work, the Rite instead summoned his granddaughter Susan, who was filling in.
- The Rite is also used in the computer game Discworld 2. The game requires the player to find not only the three small sticks (of equal length) and 4 cc of mouse blood mentioned above, but also dribbly candles, a vile stench, and some glitter. During the ritual, the wizards perform an off-key version of "Day-O (Banana Boat Song)" and Death appears behind them, fresh from vacation, wearing a cork hat.

== Appearances in other media ==
=== Film ===
In the 2022 international co-production CGI-animated film of The Amazing Maurice – adapted fairly directly from the 28th Discworld novel of 2001, The Amazing Maurice and his Educated Rodents – Death is voiced by the noted British actor and comedian Peter Serafinowicz alongside Hugh Laurie as the titular cat of equally prodigious capabilities.

=== Television ===
==== Animated ====
In the Cosgrove Hall 1997 animated adaptations of Soul Music and Wyrd Sisters (and the Welcome to the Discworld pilot based on an extract from Reaper Man), Death was voiced by Christopher Lee. In Soul Music, the voice actors are:

- Albert – Brian Pringle
- Susan Sto-Helit – Debra Gillett
- Mort – Neil Morrissey
- Ysabell – Melissa Sinden
- Quoth the Raven and the Death of Rats are uncredited.

==== Live-action ====
In the 2006 Sky One adaptation of Hogfather he was voiced by Ian Richardson. The actor who played the physical Death in Hogfather was Marnix van den Broeke, a 2 metres (6.6 feet) tall Netherlander.

In the 2008 Sky One adaptation of The Colour of Magic, van den Broeke reprised the physical role, with Christopher Lee returning to the voice the character, after the death of Richardson.

In the 2021 series The Watch, Wendell Pierce voiced Death.

=== Radio ===
Death has been voiced in all five BBC Radio adaptations of Discworld novels. Geoffrey Whitehead played the part in the adaptation of Mort, and also in Episode 1 of Eric. John Rowe played him in The Amazing Maurice and His Educated Rodents, and Michael Kilgarriff voiced Death in Episode 4 of Small Gods. In both Guards! Guards! and Wyrd Sisters, Death is credited as being played by himself (in Guards! Guards! he is actually voiced by Stephen Thorne, who also played Sergeant Colon).

=== Computer games ===
Death has appeared in various other media: in the Discworld game series he is voiced firstly by Rob Brydon and later by Nigel Planer.

=== Theatre ===
Death has also been played by numerous actors in amateur stage productions of Wyrd Sisters, Mort, Soul Music, and Hogfather, as well as various other plays based on the novels.

=== Internet culture ===
After his death in March 2015, Pratchett's daughter Rhianna wrote in three tweets from her father's Twitter account:

AT LAST, SIR TERRY, WE MUST WALK TOGETHER.

Terry took Death's arm and followed him through the doors and on to the black desert under the endless night.

The End.

Fans launched a tongue-in-cheek petition on Change.org, requesting for Death to return Pratchett to life because, "Terry Pratchett turned Death from a figure of hate into a much loved and sometimes welcomed character. No-one else cared about you Death. You owe him!"

== Associates of Death in other media ==
=== The Death of Rats ===
The Death of Rats appeared in the animated Soul Music and the radio play The Amazing Maurice and His Educated Rodents, but no voice credit was given for either. In the Hogfather TV series the voice was credited to Dorckey Hellmice (an anagram of Michelle Dockery who played Susan Sto Helit in the same TV series), while in the Discworld 2 game, the voice is credited as Katherine the Crocodile. The Death of Rats also appears in Discworld Noir.

=== Albert ===
In Cosgrove Hall's 1996 animated Soul Music, Albert was voiced by Bryan Pringle. In BBC Radio 4's 2004 adaptation of Mort, he was voiced by Philip Jackson.

In Sky One's live-action version of Hogfather, Albert was played by David Jason.

Albert also makes an appearance in the computer game Discworld 2: Missing Presumed...!?, voiced by Nigel Planer.

== See also ==
- Death (DC Comics), another fictional Death with sympathetic traits
- List of death deities
- Psychopomp
- Azrael
- Thanatos
- Pale Horseman, one of the Four Horsemen of the Apocalypse, also named Thanatos
- Charon
