= Peter Curran =

Peter Curran may refer to:

- Peter Curran (director) (1924–1999), British film director and producer
- Peter Curran (footballer) (born 1962), Australian rules footballer
- Peter Curran (presenter), British radio producer, writer, documentary maker, broadcaster and publisher
- Peter Curran (astronomer) (1977–2016), Irish astronomer
- Pete Curran (1860–1910), British Member of Parliament for Jarrow, 1907–1910

== See also ==
- John Curran (baseball) (1852–1896), baseball player, incorrectly listed as Peter Curren
