= Gothenburg English Studio Theatre =

English-language theatre company in Sweden

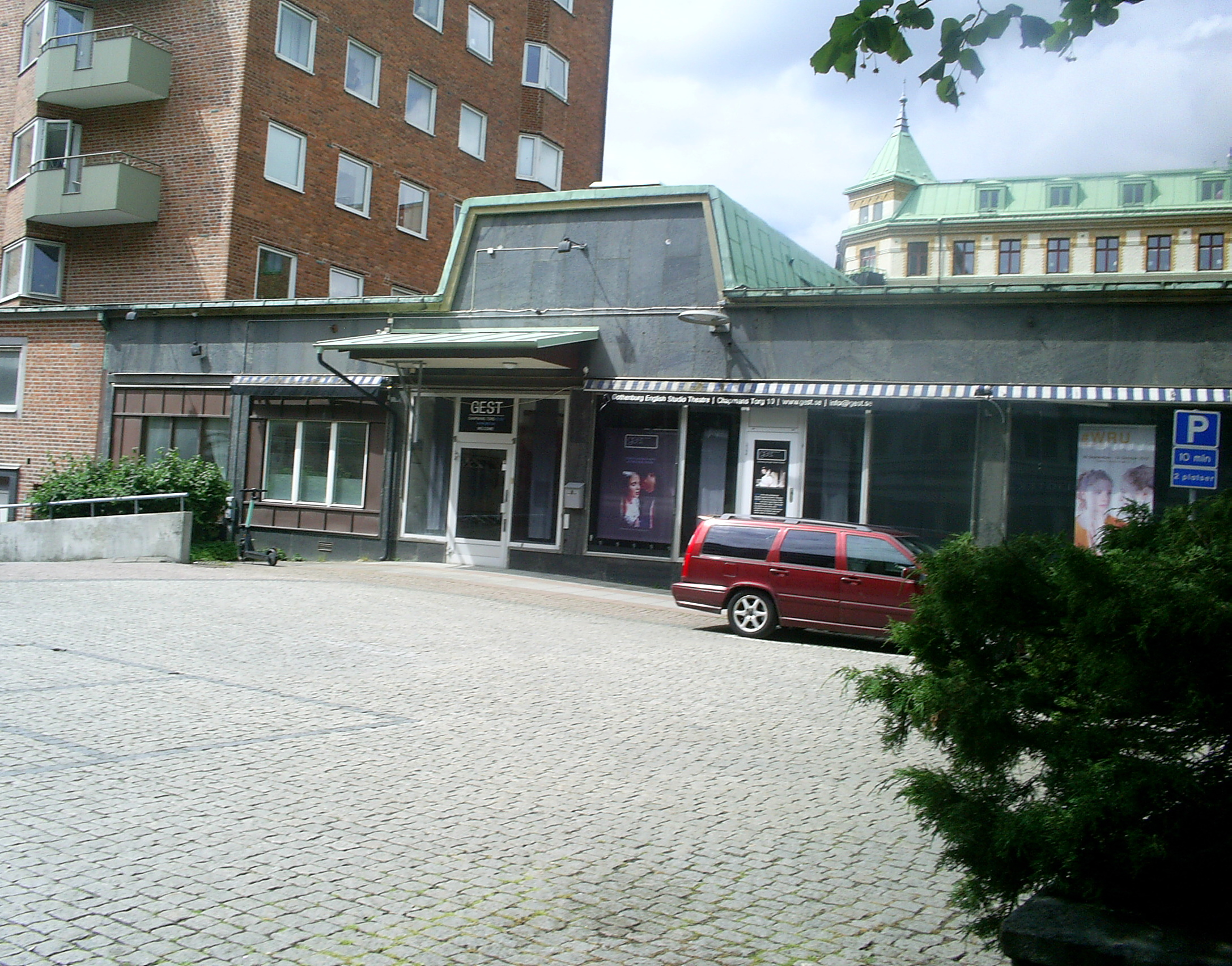
- Gothenburg English Studio Theatre, Chapmans torg
- Founded: 2005; 21 years ago
- Founder: Kristina Brändén Whitaker; Gary Whitaker
- Headquarters: Gothenburg, Sweden
- Key people: Kristina Brändén Whitaker (artistic director); Gary Whitaker (artistic director)
- Website: gest.se

The Gothenburg English Studio Theatre (GEST) is a professional English-language theatre company in Gothenburg, Sweden.

== Overview ==
The GEST was created in 2005 by Swedish actress Kristina Brändén Whitaker and English actor Gary Whitaker, a married couple who previously lived and worked in London, where they worked in theatre; they also write and direct with the GEST. The company has been headquartered in Gothenburg's Majorna district since 2012. It works with actors and directors from Sweden and Britain to stage English-language productions, and is currently the only one of its kind in west Sweden. It is a non-profit theatre working both in Sweden and abroad.

In 2010, the GEST participated in the Edinburgh Fringe Festival and was awarded the Fringe Review Award for Outstanding Theatre for its production of Kristina's play Expectations. In 2015, Scenkonstgalan awarded the GEST with the Årets Katharsis prize for its production of Nick Payne's play Constellations. In 2020, the GEST established its Creative Learning Department, which collaborates with schools, colleges, and universities by leading workshops and after-show discussions.

== Productions ==
- After Miss Julie (2006) by Patrick Marber
- The Collector (2007) by Mark Healy
- After the End (2008) by Dennis Kelly
- Stones in His Pockets (2009) by Marie Jones
- Contractions (2010) by Mike Bartlett
- Cock (2010) by Mike Bartlett
- This Wide Night (2011) by Chloë Moss
- My Romantic History (2011) by D. C. Jackson
- Expectations (2012) by Kristina Brändén Whitaker
- Fly Me to the Moon (2012) by Marie Jones
- Foxfinder (2013) by Dawn King
- The Woman in Black (2013) by Stephen Mallatratt and Susan Hill
- Belongings (2014) by Morgan Lloyd Malcolm
- Grounded (2014) by George Brant
- Constellations / One Day When We Were Young (2015) by Nick Payne
- Yen (2015) by Anna Jordan
- The Events (2016) by David Greig
- These Halcyon Days (2016) by Deirdre Kinahan
- Woody Allen(ish) (2016) by Simon Schatzberger
- Offline (2016) by Kristina Brändén Whitaker, Elizabeth Neale, and James Hogg
- Broken Biscuits (2017) by Tom Wells
- Pope Head: The Secret Life of Francis Bacon (2017) by Garry Roost
