= Susan Sto Helit =

Character in Terry Pratchett's Discworld novels

- Discworld character
- Michelle Dockery as Susan in the 2006 TV adaptation of Hogfather
- First appearance: Soul Music
- Created by: Terry Pratchett

In-universe information
- Species: Human
- Gender: Female
- Family: Death (adoptive grandfather); Death of Rats; Mort (father); Ysabell (mother)

Susan Sto Helit (also spelled Sto-Helit), once referred to as Susan Death, is a fictional character in Terry Pratchett's Discworld series of fantasy novels. She is the granddaughter of Death, the Disc's Grim Reaper, and has a number of his abilities. She appears in three Discworld novels: Soul Music, Hogfather, and Thief of Time. Being both human and supernatural, Susan is frequently and reluctantly forced away from her attempts at normal life to do battle with malign supernatural forces or to take on her grandfather's job in his absence. Death tends to rely on her in his battles against the Auditors of Reality, particularly in situations where he has no power or influence. As the series progresses, she also begins to take on roles educating children, so that, as Pratchett mentions in The Art of Discworld, she has "ended up, via that unconscious evolution that dogs characters, a kind of Goth Mary Poppins".

== Character ==
Susan is the daughter of Ysabell, Death's daughter via adoption, who is introduced in The Light Fantastic, and Mort, who was briefly Death's apprentice in the book Mort. At the end of Mort they leave Death's domain and become Duke and Duchess of Sto Helit, taking the motto Non Temetis Messor: "Don't Fear the Reaper." Susan is their only child.

Susan is introduced in Soul Music as a sixteen-year-old pupil at the Quirm College for Young Ladies, shortly after the deaths of her parents. Initially blaming Death for not saving them, she has come to accept that he is able only to grant them an eternal moment in his domain, which they have refused. After graduating — and despite being Duchess of Sto Helit — she begins a teaching career, first as a governess, in Hogfather, and then as a schoolteacher, in Thief of Time. She insists on being addressed as Miss Susan.

In Soul Music Death takes a holiday from his work in an attempt to forget his more troubling memories, and a metaphysical vacancy is created. Susan is sucked in, as Death's manservant Albert puts it, forcing her to assume the role. At first she desires to use her power to help humanity, but as the book progresses she comes to realise that she is powerless to interfere, and discovers the inevitability of death and destiny. She is released from the position following the return of her grandfather, who breaks the rules in order to save the rock star Imp Y Celyn and his band.

In Hogfather the Auditors employ Mr Teatime, an assassin who attempts to destroy the Hogfather using teeth found at the Tooth Fairy's castle to control children. Death cannot enter the Tooth Fairy's castle because it is constructed from the imaginations of children, who have no concept of death, and therefore arranges for Susan to foil their plan instead. After removing all of the Auditors' human agents from the Tooth Fairy's country, Susan saves the Hogfather from being destroyed by a group of Auditors who have taken the forms of dogs. She later kills Mr Teatime by impaling him with the poker she uses to threaten monsters.

In Thief of Time Susan once again comes into conflict with the Auditors, who are now attempting to stop time altogether. She is forced to find the son of Time, whom Death cannot influence or even see, because, being only mostly human, the boy is not subject to death. Susan is aided in her mission by Lu-Tze, a sweeper and definitely not a Monk of Time, and Myria LeJean/Unity, a former Auditor who has become human. Time's husband, Wen the Eternally Surprised, describes her as "helpfulness personified".

=== Physical appearance ===
Susan is a "slightly built young woman"; both Mustrum Ridcully and Terry Pratchett himself have described her as being "attractive in a skinny way". Her hair is pure white, but with a streak of black running through it from end to end. Although its natural state is a frizzy mass reminiscent of a dandelion, it rearranges its style of its own accord depending on Susan's mood; it tends to form a tight bun while she is working. Susan's hair is an inverted homage to Elsa Lanchester's appearance in Bride of Frankenstein, in which she wore a black beehive wig with white streaks. In The Art of Discworld, Paul Kidby draws Susan in Edwardian clothing, which he feels fits well with her job as a nanny in Hogfather.

Susan has a very striking physical presence, which both Lu-Tze and Lobsang Ludd have remarked upon, and despite her relative youth, she projects a sense of great age. She possesses a birthmark on her cheek that shows itself only when she blushes; it consists of three finger-like lines that were left on her father when Death slapped him in Mort, and which glow when she is angry. In Soul Music, she complains that, as Death's granddaughter, she should have been born with better cheekbones. She also has a Look (always capitalised) which can be rather disconcerting, even to those in authority, such as her grandfather and the headmistress of the school in which she teaches. In the television special, her Look is shown as being able to turn her face into something rather similar to a skull.

=== Powers and abilities ===
Despite only being Death's Granddaughter by adoption, Susan has inherited certain of his abilities: she can "walk through walls and live outside time and be a little bit immortal." As well as being able to find any living creature, Susan can sense whether or not an entity is human. She can understand the intentions of the Death of Rats even though she cannot directly interpret its speech, and has the ability to use her grandfather's voice to command or intimidate others. This speech is indicated, similar to Death's, "by small caps"; however, unlike those of her grandfather, the words which Susan speaks in this voice are often (if not always) enclosed within quotation marks, particularly in Hogfather.

Susan has inherited Death's perfect memory, which includes the ability to "remember the future", and an instinctive knowledge of the nature of Death's work, which gives her considerable assistance during her brief time doing her grandfather's job in Soul Music. In order to keep her from going insane, her mind represses much of the knowledge provided by this memory, but even so, parts of it occasionally permeate her consciousness, generally manifesting as premonitions or intuitive insights into forthcoming events. In Hogfather, she states that the fragmented nature of such foresight makes the power largely unhelpful.

Like Death or experienced witches, Susan can make herself completely unnoticeable to ordinary people if she so chooses, though anyone who "can see what's really there", such as Albert or Mustrum Ridcully, who are used to such things, are still able to see her if they concentrate and she is not actively trying to avoid their specific notice. During her time at Quirm College, she unconsciously used this power to avoid being asked questions in subjects in which she had no interest, such as Literature and History. Unfortunately, this caused the teachers of these subjects to believe that Susan was not attending their classes, and she was reported to the headmistress on several occasions. She solved this problem by using her power to erase the headmistress' memory of her supposed misconduct.

She possesses a unique perspective on life, in that she lacks the normal human ability to ignore things which do not fit in with a logical world-view: in Soul Music, she is able to acknowledge the enormous size of the rooms in Death's Domain, whereas most humans can only deal with the incomprehensible vastness by pretending it is not there; Hogfather reveals that she shares the ability of witches, wizards and young children to see things which are invisible to most people, such as the tooth fairy, monsters and bogeymen; in Thief of Time, she is able to identify the historical anomalies created by the History Monks' reconstruction of the shattered timeline. The latter novel also reveals that Susan possesses a sort of hyperawareness of the world around her, in that she is "aware of every step of the rocks beneath [her] feet and the stars overhead."

On various occasions, unusual circumstances have rendered some or all of Susan's powers useless: In Hogfather, she becomes completely human and finds herself bereft of her inherited gifts upon entering the Tooth Fairy's castle. This is because the laws of reality within the castle are based on the beliefs of children, which do not include a concept of death; hence the part of Susan which is derived from Death does not exist there. In Thief of Time, Susan finds herself unable to walk through walls while time is being held in stasis. She speculates that the energy of the glass clock which is holding time static is in some way interfering with her power.

Due in part to her education at Quirm College for Young Ladies, Susan possesses various practical skills, some of which contribute to her success as a governess and later a teacher: she is accomplished in the fields of Mathematics and Logic (priding herself on her ability to mentally calculate the square root of 27.4), is multilingual, and has considerable knowledge of Discworld culture. She is also a competent swimmer, being versed in four swimming strokes and several lifesaving techniques.

Despite coming from a technically purely human background, Susan has inherited abilities from her adoptive Grandfather through more-than-conventional means: her mother, Ysabell, was merely adopted into Death's family; her father, Mort, merely married into Death's family; whereas Susan was conceived and born in Death's family. In the novels, it is said "some things were inherited through more than genetics...some things were inherited through the soul...some things were in the bones."

=== Personality and traits ===
Susan's most obvious character trait is being sensible, an attribute carefully cultivated by her parents as a counterbalance to the influence of her grandfather. Initially, this manifested itself as a refusal to admit the supernatural side of the world (beyond basic magic) even existed. This is not surprising, given the fact that her parents had informed her from a very early age that there were no such things as the Soul Cake Duck, the Hogfather or the Tooth Fairy. It has even been suggested that her parents chose to name her Susan specifically because of the sensible and conventional connotations of the name. This upbringing has instilled in her a certain lack of romanticism; her personal appraisal of "a poem about daffodils" is, "Apparently the poet had liked them very much." She can be relied upon to keep her head in a crisis, something she tends to view as a character flaw.

Latterly, she accepts that she is part of the same world as the Hogfather and the Tooth Fairy—she just wishes she weren't. Indeed, in Hogfather, she is seen to be making an immense effort to remain 'normal', carefully limiting her use of her inherited powers and forcing herself to act in as 'human' a way as possible. She mentions having great difficulty in remembering things which other humans take for granted, such as the purpose of doorknobs, the way to fall asleep and how to forget things, but argues that, if she were to abandon this struggle, and give herself fully to her supernatural side, she would lose her humanity. In Thief of Time, though still resentful of having been born Death's granddaughter and attempting to avoid too much contact with the supernatural world, she appears to have accepted and even embraced her heritage: she admits, albeit grudgingly, that she is not completely human, frequently uses her powers to provide teaching aids, and views herself as an exception to the rules of normal human society, as evidenced by her willingness to investigate the personal papers of her employer, Madame Frout, without her knowledge.

In following with her practical outlook on life, Susan does not have a great deal of patience with people who behave in an inefficient or unfocussed fashion. She also has a certain distrust for philosophy, disliking its attempts to oversimplify an inherently complicated world.

She appears to have a preference for the colour black, in that most of her childhood drawings were done in this colour (mentioned in Soul Music). This fixation is not as extreme as that which her mother possessed for the colour pink, and may in fact be a characteristic inherited from Death, who made most of the decorations for his Domain black. She has an intense fixation on chocolate (provided there is no nougat in it), one about which she is very defensive.

Another aspect of her personality which may stem from her relationship with Death is the fact that she is, by her own admission, "not very musical" (her grandfather also possessed a distinct lack of talent in the field of music, making several unsuccessful attempts to learn how to play the violin and the banjo). This may be the result of her aforementioned upbringing in which imagination and creativity were not encouraged to any degree, making it more of an environmentally instilled trait than an inherited one.

Susan has, on several occasions, demonstrated rather unusual attitudes toward school and education in general: In Soul Music, she cites school as one of the greatest obstacles to education, and in Hogfather, she compares being educated to having a communicable sexual disease, in that "It made you unsuitable for a lot of jobs and then you had the urge to pass it on".

She has expressed a fondness for children, as long as they are "not raw"; hopefully meaning that although the idea of having children herself does not appeal to her, she enjoys spending time with those of other people. She also demonstrates an insight into the more disturbing aspects of childhood nature, as she enjoys listening to the sound of children playing while she is reading, but always positions herself at such a distance that she is unable to hear what the children are saying, lest she find it unsettling. Because of this insight, she has a knack for putting problem children (such as those who try to get around her rules) in their place.

=== Teaching methods ===
As the novels progress, Susan proves to be quite good at handling small children, a skill that is attributed to her sensible and practical nature. This is reflected in her novel approach to children's problems. When a child complains about a monster in the cupboard or under the bed, most parents would go to great lengths to carefully explain to the child that there is no monster. Susan, on the other hand, simply hands the child a suitable weapon with which to assault the monster, or, in the event of an actual monster, assaults it herself. Monsters, bogeymen, etc., from a wide area have come to dread the fireplace poker she uses for this task, although as word of Susan has quickly spread among the city's resident monsters, she lately has only needed to deal with newcomers. Her practical nature is quite similar to Granny Weatherwax's headology, though the two are used in different fashions.

Her approach in other areas is also unusual. For example, in her role as a governess she has found that her charges' reading progress has been greatly enhanced by using interesting books which are slightly too difficult for them, and which therefore present something of a challenge. Parents have reservations about her choice of General Tacticus' Campaigns as a reader, since it may be argued that children under ten do not necessarily need to be able to spell 'disembowelled'. When other adults point out that children should find these exercises too advanced, Susan acknowledges this, but points out that she hasn't told the children this and so far they seem not to be bothered about it.

Using her powers as a teaching aid in her career as a schoolteacher, Susan is sufficiently successful as to have parents clamouring in large numbers to have their child included in her class. Her approach to history and geography, subjects which children often find rather dull, has particularly captured her class's attention. Parents generally see the occasional need to clean their children's clothing of dried-in bloodstains or ground-in swamp mud as more than compensated for by the broad education being received. A child's description of one of the classic battles from Ankh-Morpork's long history, for example, might be sufficiently vivid and detailed to make the parent think that the description could not have been improved upon if the child had actually seen the battle at first hand—which in fact they have, given the flexibility of time and space Susan has inherited from her grandfather.

Susan's role as a caregiver to children, combined with her no-nonsense style and almost magical flair for stick-like weaponry (e.g. her grandfather's scythe, field hockey sticks, a fireplace poker), can be seen as a parody of Mary Poppins. Mary Poppins also had a very similar attitude while actively encouraging positive imagination (Susan tends to say things like "Real children don't go hoppity-skip unless they're on drugs"), took children on magical adventures (Susan does so to teach geography), introduced children to supernatural creatures (Susan employs such beings as guest speakers, including her own grandfather), and had a magic umbrella (which, while not used as a blunt object, was magical much like Death's scythe). Neither character openly acknowledges her magical powers. Both tend toward being actively insulted when reminded of their use. The link between Susan and Mary Poppins is explicitly alluded to in Hogfather, when Susan states that "She'd sworn that if she did indeed ever find herself dancing on rooftops with chimney sweeps, she'd beat herself to death with her own umbrella."

== Relationships ==
In The Art of Discworld, Pratchett describes Susan as "rather chilly", and Susan herself admits in Thief of Time that she finds it difficult to relate to other humans on a personal level because the supernatural parts of her mind tend to view mortal creatures as nothing more than "a temporary collection of atoms that [will] not be around in another few decades". She has yet to demonstrate much affection for others, though her relationship with her grandfather, once strained, improves over the course of the series. Despite this, she finds herself unable to trust him completely because of the way he occasionally manipulates her into helping him.

=== Romantic relationships ===
Though Susan was previously infatuated with rocker Imp Y Celyn (Soul Music), Thief of Time ended with an unspecified "perfect moment" between Susan and Lobsang Ludd, the new anthropomorphic personification of Time. Though the moment itself was not described, Ludd caught her attention by levitating metallic silver and gold stars and setting them spinning about near the ceiling of the Stationery Cupboard, and dimming the lighting to velvety darkness, both rather romantic gestures. Also, Myria (later known as Unity) bluntly questioned Susan as to whether or not she had romantic intentions in regard to the boy, to which Susan responded with the defensive attitude she usually reserves for her fondness of chocolates.

== Appearances in other media ==
=== Television ===
==== Animation ====
In the Cosgrove Hall animation of Soul Music, Susan was voiced by Debra Gillett.

==== Live action ====
In the Sky One live-action adaptation of Hogfather the character was played by Michelle Dockery.

=== Computer games ===
She appears as a young child in the computer game, Discworld II: Missing Presumed...!?.
