= Soul Music (TV series) =

- Genre: Fantasy, comedy
- Created by: Terry Pratchett; Martin Jameson
- Developed by: Acorn Media
- Directed by: Jean Flynn
- Starring: Andy Hockley; Debra Gillett; Christopher Lee
- Composers: Keith Hopwood; Phil Bush
- Country of origin: United Kingdom
- Original language: English
- No. of series: 1
- No. of episodes: 7

Production
- Running time: 159 min (7 episodes approx 23 min each)
- Production companies: Cosgrove Hall Films; ITEL; Ventureworld Films

Original release
- Network: Channel 4
- Release: 6 June – 18 July 1997

Related
- Welcome to the Discworld; Wyrd Sisters

Soul Music is a seven-part animated television adaptation of the 1994 book by Terry Pratchett, produced by Channel 4 Television Corporation, Cosgrove Hall Films, ITEL, and Ventureworld Films. It was first broadcast from June 6 to July 18, 1997 and released on DVD in 2001, alongside Wyrd Sisters in a box set entitled "Soul Music", by Vision Video. The feature-length miniseries was developed by Acorn Media, and directed by Jean Flynn. It was the first film adaptation of an entire Discworld novel (following the Welcome to the Discworld short, which was based on a fragment of the novel Reaper Man). The series soundtrack was also released on CD, but the disc is now out of production. The soundtrack is, however, now available through iTunes. Editz did the title sequences, Flix Facilities did the digital picture editing, and Hullabaloo Studios did the audio post-production.

== Plot ==
The series closely follows the plot of the novel, which, like many of Pratchett's novels, introduces an element of modern society into the magical and vaguely late medieval / early modern world of the Disc - in this case rock and roll music and stardom - with nearly disastrous consequences. It also introduces Susan Sto Helit, daughter of Mort and Ysabell and granddaughter of Death.

== Cast ==
- Andy Hockley - Imp y Celyn
- Debra Gillett - Susan Sto Helit
- Christopher Lee - Death
- Graham Crowden - Mustrum Ridcully
- Neil Morrissey - Mort
- Bernard Wrigley - Asphalt
- Rob Rackstraw - Glod Glodsson, The Librarian
- George Harris - Lias Bluestone
- John Jardine - Impy's Dad
- Brian Pringle - Albert
- Rosalie Scase - Owner of Music Shop
- Melissa Sinden - Ysabell
- Jimmy Hibbert - Additional Voices
- David Holt - Mr. Clete
- Maggie Fox - Ms. Butts

== Parody of the music industry ==
Soul Music has numerous allusions to various aspects of the music industry, including groupies, music-recording devices, and most notably the history of rock and roll. The Geeky Guide To Everything noted "Each new number depicted a different aspect or period of rock music ranging from the likes of beat music all the way to the Beatles. And this made for an entertaining musical and visual experience". NeedCoffee said "the songs that The Band with Rocks In sings manage to be send-ups and faithful recreations of the various styles rock-n-roll has been through". PopMatters notes "the whole adventure is a parody of the music industry in the world outside of the story". The Geeky Guide to Everything described it as a "quirky celebration...of rock music's history". Terry Pratchett said "Rock and Roll is sung about and talked about as though it is some kind of a living thing – it won't fade away, it'll never die. It has a meaning quite apart from a particular type of musical sound, and then consider the large number of people to whom it offered tremendous fame for a few years and then sudden death, as if there was some kind of devil's bargain going on."

The series takes the association of the "Band with Rocks In" with the Beatles even further than the book does, evolving their style from 1950s rock and early 1960s beat music (and mixing-bowl haircuts) in Ankh-Morpork, to acid rock in Scrote, to spiritual hippie rock in Quirm. In Sto Lat, they sound like the Jimi Hendrix Experience or Bad Company, but are dressed in clothes similar to the Beatles on the cover of the Sgt. Pepper's Lonely Hearts Club Band album. Also in Quirm, Buddy says that the band is 'more popular than cheeses,' referring to John Lennon's famous quote proclaiming the Beatles to be more popular than Jesus. In Pseudopolis, their outfits and style resemble the Blues Brothers. Crash's band is also given the name "Socks Pastels", referencing the Sex Pistols.

== Critical reception ==
The Geeky Guide to Everything gave Soul Music a rating of 3.5 out of 5. NeedCoffee gave it a rating of 3.5 out of 5.

FilmMonthly says Soul Music is the "first and better adaptation" of Pratchett's work by Acorn Films (the other one being Wyrd Sisters). It said that both adaptions would please fans of the Discworld franchise, even though certain content had to be left out due to time, resources, and the different medium - and also that in-jokes and recurring characters would be unfamiliar to newcomers. It concluded that Soul Music, unlike Wyrd Sisters, could be seen by both fans and non-fans. Alternatively, NeedCoffee noted that the story may not be for newcomers to the series. It also said "Soul Music is extremely faithful to the novel in this cartoon retelling," and commented on the revisions from the book, noting that the tone remained faithful to the Pratchett style. PopMatters suggested the reason Pratchett's works are rarely adapted to film is because "they don't translate well into film". It said "oftentimes Pratchett's clever language jokes [such as homonyms] are lost in the dialogue of the screen since the visual cue of the printed words is necessary to cotton on." Rambles said the series "is fairly true to the novel", though adds it "fails to match Pratchett's wit and pacing."

FilmMonthly added that while "the animation in these two tales has been roundly criticized for being below par [and crude]...it's not as awful as some reviewers claim". The Geeky Guide to Everything said the animation reminded the site of Flight of Dragons, which works within the "overall sense of whimsy" of the show. NeedCoffee described the animation as "not that great", though complimented the character design. PopMatters said that both adaptions are watchable in half-hour chunks, but "when run back to back...the animation style becomes tedious very quickly". It said the 3D animated opening sequence has "slightly dated animation" of the opening sequence, and that the 2D animation has a "disappointing cartoonishness". Rambles described the animation as "mediocre" and a "half-hearted effort".

The Geeky Guide to Everything noted that the casting of the voices were adequate and singled out Christopher Lee as Death as a "home run". NeedCoffee spoke highly of the choice of voice overs, especially Christopher Lee as Death, whose performance was described as "urbane, polite, and somewhat weary". Rambles described the choosing of Christopher Lee as the voice of Death as "a master stroke" and "perfect casting". Rambles said "Besides Lee, the vocal talents are adequate without being exceptional -- and the Liverpudlian accent sported by Glod the dwarf is a bit over the top."
