= Loose Ends (radio programme) =

British radio programme (1986–)

- Genre: Entertainment
- Running time: 45 minutes (6:15 pm – 7:00 pm)
- Country of origin: United Kingdom
- Language: English
- Home station: BBC Radio 4
- Syndicates: BBC Radio 4 Extra (2011–2015)
- Hosted by: Ned Sherrin (1986–2006); Clive Anderson (2007–present)
- Recording studio: Broadcasting House
- Original release: 4 January 1986
- Audio format: Stereo
- Website: www.bbc.co.uk/programmes/b006qjym
- Podcast: www.bbc.co.uk/programmes/b006qjym/episodes/downloads

Loose Ends is a British radio programme originally broadcast on Saturday mornings, and then transmitted early Saturday evenings from 1998 by BBC Radio 4. It was hosted by Ned Sherrin until 2006 and has been hosted by Clive Anderson, Nikki Bedi and Peter Curran since 2007. The programme brings together guests, generally from the world of entertainment, in a mix of interviews, sets by comedians and musical sessions.

== History ==
First broadcast in 1986, it developed out of The Colour Supplement, a Sunday morning programme which had featured early Loose Ends contributors such as Stephen Fry, Robert Elms and Victor Lewis-Smith. The latter's contributions to Loose Ends were recorded packages, being a mischievous and disruptive element of the programme.

Originally commissioned comedy had, by 2006, been phased out almost entirely, with comic performers tending to deliver existing material from their repertoires although, in June/July 2006, the Scots comedian and writer Janey Godley scripted a weekly series of satiric fictional extracts from Nancy Dell'Olio's Diary to coincide with the FIFA World Cup. Dell' Olio was the girlfriend of England national football team coach Sven-Göran Eriksson.

Typically the programme was topped and tailed by Sherrin reading a comic monologue which, over the years, was written by Alistair Beaton, D. A. Barham, Ian Brown & James Hendrie, Nev Fountain, Tom Jamieson, Tom Mitchelson, Ian Hawkins, Terence Dackombe, Andrew Nickolds, Steve Punt and Pete Sinclair.

When Sherrin became ill with a throat infection in late 2006, later diagnosed as throat cancer, Peter Curran stood in as presenter of Loose Ends with Patrick Kielty and Clive Anderson as guest presenters. Sherrin died of throat cancer on 1 October 2007. Clive Anderson became permanent replacement host in 2007.

In 2024, alternate presenters have included Nihal Arthanayake and Stuart Maconie.
