= Bunk Bed (radio programme) =

- Genre: Discussion
- Running time: 15 minutes
- Country of origin: United Kingdom
- Home station: BBC Radio 4
- Hosted by: Peter Curran & Patrick Marber
- Original release: April 2, 2014

Bunk Bed is a comedy radio programme on BBC Radio 4 hosted by Peter Curran and Patrick Marber. The programme features the hosts lying in bunk beds, discussing various topics. In some episodes, they are joined by a guest on the "pull-out mattress". Past guests include Kathy Burke, Don Warrington, Cate Blanchett, Benjamin Zephaniah, Rhys Ifans, Jane Horrocks, Guy Garvey and Rachael Stirling.

It was described as 'The perfect radio antidote to the gathering storm' by Kate Chisholm, and was praised by Miranda Sawyer in the Observer as being "strange, funny, silly, enchanting, beautifully put together". The programme was a finalist in the New York Festivals in April 2020. The ninth and tenth series featured Harry Shearer of The Simpsons and theatre director Sir Richard Eyre talking about their childhoods. The eleventh series appeared on Radio4/BBC Sounds in March 2025.

== Podcasts ==
There are over 30 podcasts (created from edited versions of the episodes originally broadcast) which are freely available to stream or download. In addition other episodes from Series 8 and 9 are available to listen again.

No.	Title
1	"Welcome to Bunk Bed"
• In bed with a friend, your mind can wander into brilliant and strange conversations.
2	"The death of friends and the comfort of Bowie"
• Peter Curran and Patrick Marber on the death of friends and the comfort of Bowie.
3	"Madonna elephants and snoring"
• Peter Curran and Patrick Marber on meeting Madonna, a tuneless elephant, and Mr. Spanky.
4	"Award winning actor and director Kathy Burke joins Peter and Patrick"
• Peter Curran and Patrick Marber are joined by award-winning actor/director Kathy Burke.
5	"Happiness, small birds and Spike Milligan"
• Peter and Patrick talk about the secret of happiness and small birds on anti-depressants.
6	"Famous older men and the voice of Aldous Huxley"
• Peter Curran and Patrick Marber talk leaving their female partners for famous older men.
7	"HG Wells and his life as a prostitute"
• Peter Curran and Patrick Marber on HG Wells and his life as a prostitute.
8	"The curse of short trousers"
• Peter Curran and Patrick Marber on the curse of short trousers and the blandness of Bond.
9	"JG Ballard and why the demons come out at night"
• Peter Curran and Patrick Marber are haunted by the voice of sci-fiction great JG Ballard
10	"Debbie Harry and Chas n Dave"
• Peter Curran and Patrick Marber on their times with Debbie Harry and Chas n Dave
11	"Award Winning actor Jane Horrocks on the spare mattress"
• Peter Curran and Patrick Marber are joined by the award-winning actor Jane Horrocks.
12	"Peter and Patrick imagine each other’s death"
• Peter Curran and Patrick Marber imagine each other’s deaths
13	"The dirty version of Crazy Golf"
• Peter Curran and Patrick Marber plan to create the dirty version of Crazy Golf
14	"Abuse in school and Ian Fleming v Raymond Chandler"
• Peter and Patrick talk about being abused in school and Raymond Chandler v Ian Fleming
15	"The first person to have a dream"
• Peter Curran and Patrick Marber wonder about the first person to have a dream.
16	"Terrible names for kids"
• Peter Curran and Patrick Marber on the terrible names for kids chosen by their friends.

No.	Title
17	"The hand that shook the hand of Hitler"
• Peter and Patrick on the hand that shook the hand of Hitler and eating from a baby bib.
18	"How a sneaky million pounds was turned down"
• Peter and Patrick on how a sneaky million pounds Hollywood job was turned down
19	"The teeth of Kingsley Amis"
• Peter and Patrick on the teeth of Kingsley Amis and why you can’t cuddle a tortoise.
20	"Comic great Kathy Burke joins Peter and Patrick"
• Comic great Kathy Burke sleeps over to talk youth rebellion and reading porn aloud.
21	"Being a father and the voice of James Baldwin"
• Peter Curran and Patrick Marber on being a father and the voice of James Baldwin
22	"Giant hairballs and goats"
• Peter and Patrick talk about the giant hairballs formed on London’s Underground
23	"Citizen Kane and Virginia Woolf"
• The rude bits of Citizen Kane and the only recording of Virginia Woolf’s voice
24	"How to hurt yourself at the dentist"
• The need for a National Repression Day when everyone would just shut up about themselves.
25	"With guest Don Warrington from the classic Rising Damp"
• Peter and Patrick with guest Don Warrington from the legendary 1970’s sitcom Rising Damp.
26	"Baldness and Bambi"
• Peter Curran and Patrick Marber get down to the subject of wigs and how to help Bambi
27	"Their worst reviews ever"
• Peter Curran and Patrick Marber relish their worst ever reviews
28	"Explaining genitalia to Aliens"
• Peter Curran and Patrick Marber on explaining human genitalia to a curious alien
29	"The voice of Bette Davis and sedan chairs are Go!"
• Peter and Patrick marvel at the voice of Bette Davis destroying an interviewer
30	"Cate Blanchett"
• Patrick Marber and Peter Curran offer the pull-out mattress to a double Oscar winner.
31	"Benjamin Zephaniah"
• Patrick Marber and Peter Curran do Tai Chi in the dark with the poet Benjamin Zephaniah
32	"Rhys Ifans"
• Peter Curran, Patrick Marber and Rhys talk dark childhoods and the boots of David Bowie.
33	"Jane Horrocks"
• Jane Horrocks joins Patrick Marber and Peter Curran to reflect on fancying yourself.
