= After Miss Julie =

Play written by Patrick Marber

- After Miss Julie Original West End Production Poster
- Original language: English
- Written by: Patrick Marber
- Genre: Comedy Drama

Premiere
- Date: 20 November 2003
- Place: England
- Official website

After Miss Julie is a 1995 play by Patrick Marber which relocates August Strindberg's naturalist tragedy, Miss Julie (1888), to an English country house in July 1945. The re-imagining of the events of Strindberg's original are transposed to the night of the British Labour Party's "landslide" election victory.

== Plot and characters ==
There are only three characters in After Miss Julie; Miss Julie, a rich lady in her 20s, and two servants: John, a valet/chauffeur, aged 30, and Christine, a cook, aged 35. The action takes place in the kitchen of a large country house outside London, when the British Labour Party have just won their famous 'landslide' election defeat.

== Production history ==
=== Screen ===
After Miss Julie, stolen and directed by Patrick Marber, was screened by BBC 2 on 4 November 1995 as part of the Performance series. Miss Julie was played by Geraldine Somerville, John was played by Phil Daniels and Christine was played by Kathy Burke.

=== Stage ===
The stage premiere was at the Donmar Warehouse in London on 20 November 2003; its run ended on 7 February 2004. The three characters were played by Kelly Reilly (Miss Julie), Richard Coyle (John) and Helen Baxendale (Christine). The production was directed by Michael Grandage. It received generally very positive reviews, Kelly Reilly particularly praised for her performance. The Telegraph said it was "an unforgettable night of white-hot theatrical intensity" and The Guardian gave it 4 out of 5 stars.

The Young Vic revived After Miss Julie in March 2012 as its first production of Classics for A New Climate. It was directed by Natalie Abrahami. Natalie Dormer played the title role, Kieran Bew John, and Polly Frame Christine. The production was sold out with Natalie Dormer receiving particularly high praise. Sarah Hemming of the Financial Times gave it 4 out of 5 stars as did Lyn Gardner in The Guardian calling it 'Natalie Abrahami's compulsively watchable revival'

Gothenburg English Studio Theatre in Sweden made a production of After Miss Julie during the spring of 2006. It was directed by Naomi Jones and portrayed by Emma Parsons (Christine), Gary Whitaker (John) and Kristina Brändén Whitaker (Miss Julie).

The regional premiere was at the Theatre by the Lake in Keswick on Friday, 28 July 2006. Its run ended on 1 November 2006. The characters were played by Juliette Goodman (Miss Julie), Guy Parry (John) and Polly Lister (Christine). It was directed by Simon H West. The production was praised for its impact, acting and sexual charge.

Salisbury Playhouse produced a production of After Miss Julie from 1–24 October 2009, directed by Tom Daley.

=== Broadway ===
The Roundabout Theatre Company produced the Broadway premiere on 22 October 2009 at the American Airlines Theatre to mixed reviews. It starred Sienna Miller (Miss Julie), Jonny Lee Miller (John) and Marin Ireland (Christine), and was directed by Mark Brokaw with light designs by Mark McCullough.
