= Mort =

1987 Discworld novel by Terry Pratchett

- First edition
- Author: Terry Pratchett
- Cover artist: Josh Kirby
- Language: English
- Series: Discworld; 4th novel – 1st Death story
- Subject: Anthropomorphic personifications and death; Characters: Death, Mort, Ysabell, Albert; Locations: Death's Domain
- Genre: Fantasy
- Publisher: Victor Gollancz Ltd in association with Colin Smythe
- Publication date: November 12, 1987
- Pages: 304
- Awards: Came 65th in the Big Read
- ISBN: 0-575-04171-4
- OCLC: 16685210
- Preceded by: Equal Rites
- Followed by: Sourcery

Mort is a fantasy novel by British writer Terry Pratchett. Published in 1987, it is the fourth Discworld novel and the first to focus on the character Death, who only appeared as a side character in the previous novels. The title is the name of its main character, and is also a play on words: in French, mort means "death" or "dead"; the French-language edition is titled Mortimer.

In 2004, Pratchett stated that Mort was the first Discworld novel with which he was "pleased", stating that in previous books, the plot had existed to support the jokes, but that in Mort, the plot was integral.

== Plot summary ==
As a teenager, Mort has a personality and temperament that makes him unsuited to the family farming business. Mort's father Lezek takes him to a local hiring fair in the hope that Mort will land an apprenticeship. Just before the last stroke of midnight, Death arrives and takes Mort on as an apprentice. Death takes Mort to his domain, where he meets Death's elderly manservant Albert, and his adopted daughter Ysabell. Mort later accompanies Death as he travels to collect the soul of the King of Sto Lat, who is due to be assassinated by the scheming Duke of Sto Helit. After Mort unsuccessfully tries to prevent the assassination, Death warns him that all deaths are predetermined, and that he cannot interfere with fate.

Death assigns Mort to collect the soul of Princess Keli, daughter of the murdered king, but he instead kills the assassin the Duke had sent after her. Keli lives, but shortly after the assassin's death people begin acting as if something had happened without knowing why, namely what would be funeral preparations and acts of mourning. She soon finds that the rest of the world no longer acknowledges her existence unless she confronts them and even then they forget her immediately after. She subsequently employs the wizard Igneous Cutwell, who is able to see her as he is trained to see things that are invisible to normal people to make her existence clear to the public. Mort eventually discovers that his actions have created an alternate reality in which Keli lives, but he also learns that it is being overridden by the original reality and will eventually cease to exist, killing Keli. While consulting Cutwell, Mort sees a picture of Unseen University's founder, Alberto Malich, noting that he bears a resemblance to Albert.

Mort and Ysabell travel into the Stack, a library in Death's domain that holds the biographies of everyone who has ever lived, in order to investigate Albert, eventually discovering that he is indeed Malich. They further learn that Malich had feared monsters waiting for him in the afterlife, and performed a reversed version of the Rite of AshkEnte in the hope of keeping Death away from him. The spell backfired and sent him to Death's side, where he has remained in order to put off his demise. During this time, Death, yearning to relish what being human is like, travels to Ankh-Morpork to indulge in new experiences, including getting drunk, dancing, gambling and finding a job. Mort in turn starts to become more like Death, adopting his mannerisms and aspects of his personality, while his own is slowly overridden.

Death's absence forces Mort to collect the next two souls, who are both located on separate parts of the Disc (in the Agatean Empire and Tsort, respectively), and due to die on the same night that the alternate reality will be destroyed. Before he and Ysabell leave to collect the souls, Mort uses the part of Death within him to force Albert to provide a spell that will slow down the alternate reality's destruction. After Mort and Ysabell leave, Albert returns to Unseen University, under the identity of Malich. His eagerness to live on the Disc is reinvigorated during this time, and he has the wizards perform the Rite of AshkEnte in the hope of finally escaping Death's grasp. The ritual summons both Death and the part of Death that had been taking Mort over, restoring him to normal. Unaware of Albert's treachery, Death takes him back into his service, the Librarian preventing the wizard's escape.

Mort and Ysabell travel to Keli's palace, where the princess and Cutwell have organised a hasty coronation ceremony in the hope that Keli can be crowned queen before the alternate reality is destroyed. With the reality now too small for Albert's spell, Mort and Ysabell save Keli and Cutwell from being destroyed with the alternate reality. They return to Death's domain to find a furious Death waiting for them, the latter having learned of Mort's actions from Albert. Death dismisses Mort and attempts to take the souls of Keli and Cutwell, but Mort challenges him to a duel for them. Though Death eventually wins the duel, he spares Mort's life and sends him back to the Disc.

Death convinces the gods to change the original reality so that Keli rules in place of the Duke, who was inadvertently killed during Death and Mort's duel due to the destruction of his lifetimer. Mort and Ysabell – who have fallen in love over the course of the story – get married, and are made Duke and Duchess of Sto Helit by Keli, while Cutwell is made the Master of the Queen's Bedchamber. Death attends Mort and Ysabell's wedding reception, where he warns Mort that he will have to make sure that the original Duke's destiny is fulfilled, and presents him with the alternate reality he created, now shrunk to the size of a large pearl, before the two part on amicable terms.

== Characters ==
- Death
- Mort
- Ysabell
- Binky, Death's horse
- Albert
- Keli
- Cutwell

== Adaptations ==
Stephen Briggs adapted the novel for the stage in 1992.

The novel was adapted as a graphic novel, Mort: The Big Comic, published in 1994.

The novel has been adapted by Robin Brooks for BBC Radio Four. Narrated by Anton Lesser, with Geoffrey Whitehead as Death, Carl Prekopp as Mort, Clare Corbett as Ysabell and Alice Hart as Princess Keli, the programme was first broadcast in four parts in mid-2004 and has been repeated frequently, most recently on Radio 4 Extra.

On 15 December 2007 a German-language stage musical adaptation premiered in Hamburg.

An English musical adaptation of Mort was presented in Guildford in August 2008 by Youth Music Theatre UK. The adaptation was by Jenifer Toksvig (sister of Sandi Toksvig) and the composer was Dominic Haslam. A new production, directed by Luke Sheppard, was staged at the Greenwich Theatre in 2011.

=== Cancelled animated adaptation ===
After the film The Princess and the Frog (2009), Disney animators John Musker and Ron Clements planned that their next project would be an animated film version of Mort, but their failure to obtain the film rights prevented them from continuing with the project, instead creating Moana.

== Reception ==
Dave Langford reviewed Mort for White Dwarf #96, and stated that "After a slightly less successful experiment in Equal Rites, Pratchett has sussed the combination of hilarity with a tortuous plot, and the rest of us would-be humorists hate him for it."

In the BBC's 2003 Big Read contest, viewers voted on the "Nation's Best-loved Book"; Mort was among the Top 100 and chosen as the most popular of Pratchett's novels.

== Reviews ==
- Review by Faren Miller (1987) in Locus, #322 November 1987
- Review by Jon Wallace (1988) in Vector 142
- Review by Andy Robertson (1988) in Interzone, #23 Spring 1988
- Review by Alan Fraser (1989) in Paperback Inferno, #76
- Review by Robert Devereaux (1989) in 2 AM, Fall 1989
- Review [German] by Berthold Giese (1990) in Science Fiction Times, August 1990

Reading order guide
| Preceded by Equal Rites | 4th Discworld Novel | Succeeded by Sourcery |
| Preceded by None | 1st Death Story; Published in 1987 | Succeeded by Reaper Man |
