= Japan: Earth's Enchanted Islands =

2015 British documentary TV series

- Series title card from UK broadcast
- Also known as: Wild Japan
- Genre: Nature documentary
- Narrated by: Michelle Dockery
- Composer: Benji Merrison
- Country of origin: United Kingdom
- No. of episodes: 3

Production
- Executive producers: Tim Martin; James Honeyborne
- Producer: Mary Summerill
- Production location: Japan
- Running time: 58–59 minutes
- Production companies: BBC Natural History Unit; NHK; National Geographic Channel

Original release
- Network: BBC Two; BBC Two HD
- Release: 8 June – 22 June 2015

Related
- Alaska: Earth's Frozen Kingdom; Atlantic: The Wildest Ocean on Earth

Japan: Earth's Enchanted Islands (also known as Wild Japan for international release) is a nature documentary series exploring the landscapes and wildlife of Japan. It was narrated by Michelle Dockery and was co-produced by the BBC Natural History Unit, NHK and National Geographic Channel. The series was broadcast in three parts in the United Kingdom, where it premiered in June 2015 on BBC Two and BBC Two HD.

== Episodes ==
No.	Title	Produced and directed by	Original release date
1	"Honshu"	Gavin Maxwell	8 June 2015
Honshu is Japan's largest island, where over 100 million people live in an area one-sixth the size of France. The landscape is the most extreme of approximately 6800 Japanese islands, with some of the coldest and snowiest places in the whole of Japan in the north around Aomori or in the central Japanese 'Alps'. It also has some of the highest recorded summer temperatures during the humid spell of July and August, when the rains that previously fell during the short June rainy season cease. In these areas are found black bears, serow and macaques while in cities like Tokyo, a raccoon dog, called a tanuki can be found.
2	"The Southwest Islands"	David Marks	15 June 2015
The islands comprise the fourth-largest island, Kyushu, and all the small islands beyond including the most populous, Okinawa, to Yonaguni which lies only 80 km from Taiwan. Kyushu has the most active volcano in Japan, Sakurajima. Surrounded by mineral rich soil, giant vegetables are grown and people lie in the sand heated ground. Yakushima, the next island, has thousand-year-old cedar tree forests that have UNESCO world heritage status. This island is home to a sika deer and macaque population of 10,000 each. Okinawa has the Iriomote mangroves and forests, where the Iriomote cat as well as some of the world's smallest wild boars can be found and on the beaches green turtles.
3	"Hokkaido"	Susie Painter	22 June 2015
Hokkaido is the large island to the north separated from the rest of Japan by a deep ocean trench. Once connected to Siberia, the wildlife, brown bears, chipmunks, and others, crossed to the island before the last ice-age melted, severing the land. The island was controlled by the indigenous Ainu people until Japanese settlers in the nineteenth century made the island the bread basket of Japan, growing wheat, potatoes, maize, and lavender in the few hot months of summer. Sika deer and red-crowned cranes hang about the fields looking for a meal.
