= Hogfather =

1996 Discworld novel by Terry Pratchett

- First edition
- Author: Terry Pratchett
- Cover artist: Josh Kirby
- Language: English
- Series: Discworld; 20th novel – 4th Death story
- Subject: Christmas, children's stories, the power of belief; Characters: Death, Susan Sto Helit; Locations: Death's Domain, Ankh-Morpork, Tooth Fairy's domain
- Genre: Fantasy
- Publisher: Victor Gollancz
- Publication date: 1996
- Awards: Came 137th in the Big Read
- ISBN: 0-575-06403-X
- OCLC: 36217246
- Preceded by: Feet of Clay
- Followed by: Jingo

Hogfather is the 20th Discworld novel by Terry Pratchett, and a 1997 British Fantasy Award nominee. It was first released in 1996 and published by Victor Gollancz. It came in 137th place in The Big Read, a BBC survey of the most loved British books of all time, making it one of fifteen books by Pratchett in the Top 200.

The book focuses on the absence of the Hogfather, a mythical creature akin to Father Christmas, who grants children's wishes on Hogswatchnight (December 32) and brings them presents. While Death attempts to fill in for the Hogfather, his granddaughter Susan Sto Helit tries to find and rescue the Hogfather.

== Plot summary ==
The Auditors of Reality, a group of 'celestial bureaucrats', attempt to eliminate the Hogfather, a jolly god-like creature who brings children presents on December 32nd, similar to the figures of Santa Claus and Father Christmas in the US and UK. Forbidden to interfere directly by "The Rules", they pay the Assassin's Guild to kill the Hogfather instead. The task is given to Mr. Teatime who has a reputation for ruthlessness and creative solutions. Mr. Teatime enlists the help of some gangsters to find a delivery person working for the Tooth Fairy, using his magic to break into her kingdom and stealing all the collected teeth. With these teeth, he is able to control all the children on the Discworld, commanding them to no longer believe in the Hogfather.

Knowing that the Hogfather is also responsible for the sun rising, Death attempts to maintain belief by dressing up as the Hogfather and fulfilling his role, aided by his servant Albert. Due to Death's simplistic understanding of the meaning of Hogswatch, he commits several acts supposedly to aid restoring belief in the Hogfather but which Albert believes are unacceptable, including granting more life to a deceased matchgirl and stealing food from a luxury restaurant to give to the Canting Crew (whilst replacing said restaurant's stock with mud and old boots). Since he is unable himself to defeat Mr. Teatime, who is in a realm created by children's belief where death (and thus Death) does not exist, he appears at his granddaughter's place of work dressed as the Hogfather. As he had planned, Susan Sto Helit is unable to resist her curiosity and tries to find the Hogfather. She visits the Hogfather's Castle of Bones, only to find the hung-over Bilious, the "Oh God" of Hangovers. In an attempt to cure Bilious from his hangovers, Susan visits the Unseen University, where it is discovered that several small gods and beings (including Bilious, a Verruca Gnome, a Hair Loss Fairy, an Eater of Pencils, an Eater of Socks, Towel Wasps, and a Cheerful Fairy) are being created due to an abundance of excess belief in the world caused by the Hogfather's disappearance.

Susan and Bilious travel to the Tooth Fairy's realm and discover Mr. Teatime's plot. Mr. Teatime attacks Susan using Death's sword, but since it does not work in this realm, Susan is able to overpower him and throw him down the tower, causing him to disappear. After Susan witnesses the Tooth Fairy (in fact, the original Bogey Man, who became the Tooth Fairy to protect children) die from the exhaustion from defending its kingdom, she tasks the childlike Banjo Lilywhite, the last surviving gangster, to carry on the task of protecting the teeth. She then manages to rescue the Hogfather, who has reverted to his former self as a hog, from Auditors who hound him in the form of attack dogs. As Susan is returning to her place of work, Death explains what happened to Susan but she is attacked by Teatime whom she finally manages to kill using the kitchen poker.

== Characters ==
- Jonathan Teatime, an assassin
- Susan Sto-Helit, Death's granddaughter
- Death
- Auditors of Reality
- Hogfather, a god
- Albert
- Bilious, the Oh God of Hangovers

The Wizards of the Unseen University:

- Mustrum Ridcully, Archchancellor of Unseen University
- Lecturer in Recent Runes
- Chair of Indefinite Studies
- The Bursar
- Hex
- Ponder Stibbons
- Adrian Turnipseed aka Mad Drongo
- Dean
- Senior Wrangler
- the Librarian

== TV adaptation ==
A two-part TV film version of Hogfather was screened on 17 and 18 December 2006 on Sky One in the UK, with Ian Richardson as the voice of Death and David Jason playing Death's manservant Albert. Marc Warren played Mr. Teatime, Michelle Dockery played Susan Sto Helit, Rhodri Meilir played Bilious, and Tony Robinson (who narrated several audiobook versions of the Discworld novels) played the shop keeper Vernon Crumley. Terry Pratchett himself had a brief cameo as the toy-maker.

The US debut was on 25 November 2007 on ION Television, the Australian on 23 and 24 December 2007 on Channel Seven, and the German on 25 December 2007 on ProSieben.

== Reception ==
The novel entered the UK Top 10 charts at #1 as hardback in October 1996 and as paperback in November 1997. According to Publishers Weekly, Pratchett used a darker tone and edgier satire for Hogfather than his previous work, and so moved beyond the realm of humorous fantasy and into position as "one of the more significant contemporary English-language satirists".

Paul Pettengale reviewed Hogfather for Arcane magazine, rating it a 6 out of 10 overall, and stated that "Pratchett's jokes are becoming, with each book he writes, a little more strained, I feel. Yes, there are plenty of pages which have a line or two that make you chuckle out loud, but equally, to get to these occasional gems you have to wade through a fair amount of unfunny tosh. Die-hard fans will no doubt laugh their way through the entirety of Hogfather, but occasional browsers of Pratchett's works are not going to find this one of his best. Not quite hogwash, sure, but Hogfather is Pratchett ticking over, rather than revving his joke engine hard."

Reading order guide
Preceded by Feet of Clay	20th Discworld Novel	Succeeded by Jingo
Preceded by Soul Music	4th Death Story; Published in 1996	Succeeded by Thief of Time
