= Thief of Time =

2001 Discworld novel by Terry Pratchett

- First edition
- Author: Terry Pratchett
- Cover artist: Josh Kirby
- Language: English
- Series: Discworld; 26th novel – 5th Death story
- Subject: Wuxia and martial arts films, apocalypse, Momo, Matrix; Characters: Death, Susan, Lu-Tze, Jeremy Clockson, Lobsang Ludd, Nanny Ogg; Locations: Ankh-Morpork, Ramtops
- Genre: Fantasy
- Publisher: Doubleday
- Publication date: 2001
- Awards: Came 152nd in the Big Read
- ISBN: 0-06-019956-3
- OCLC: 45854433
- Preceded by: The Truth
- Followed by: The Last Hero

Thief of Time is a fantasy novel by British writer Terry Pratchett, the 26th book in his Discworld series. It was the last Discworld novel with a cover by Josh Kirby.

== Plot summary ==
The Auditors hire young clockmaker Jeremy Clockson to build a perfect glass clock, without telling him that this will stop time and thereby eliminate human unpredictability from the universe. Death discovers their plans, but cannot act against them directly, so he instead sends his granddaughter Susan Sto Helit. Meanwhile, Lu-Tze of the History Monks leads gifted young apprentice Lobsang Ludd in a desperate mission.

== Characters ==
Death
The anthropomorphic personification of Death, or Grim Reaper, a recurring and popular character in the Discworld series.
Jeremy Clockson
A master clockmaker tasked with creating the perfect clock, whose name is a pun on British broadcaster Jeremy Clarkson.
Susan Sto Helit
Death's granddaughter.
Lu-Tze
A powerful member of the History Monks masquerading as a humble sweeper.
Lobsang
Ludd – apprentice of Lu-Tze
Lady Myria LeJean
A woman who commissions Jeremy to make an accurate clock.

== Reception ==
Thief of Time was shortlisted for the 2002 Locus Award for Best Fantasy Novel.

At The Guardian, Sam Jordison called it "as complicated, daft, hilarious and satisfying as vintage P. G. Wodehouse: part kung fu epic, part philosophical novel, part mind-bending experiment with chaos theory (and a piss-take of those three things)", and categorized it as a book to "give (readers) hope". At the SF Site, Steven H Silver observed that the book's parodying of action films is "masterful", and commended Pratchett for how "fresh" the humor was—while conceding that "reader(s) may not laugh out loud ... but there will be plenty of internal chuckling".

At Infinity Plus, John Grant noted that it has "fewer moments of uproarious humour than" the majority of Pratchett's oeuvre, and that the "narrative fails to engender any sense of urgency in the places where it should", concluding that although "one could swiftly lay hands on a dozen genre-fantasy novels that are less worthwhile", it was not Pratchett's best work.

== Writing process ==
During a 2011 interview, Pratchett discussed his process for writing, and mentioned a self-invented goddess of writers called Narrativia, whom he believed to be smiling upon him throughout his career. One example of Narrativia's intervention from Thief Of Time was the naming of a key character, Ronnie Soak, the forgotten fifth horseman of the apocalypse. Pratchett stated that he had picked the name at random, and was later "astonished when he noticed what it sounded like backwards. Suddenly, he knew of what this particular horseman would be a harbinger." In a direct quote Pratchett revealed his satisfaction with this coincidence, "I thought chaos – yes! Chaos, the oldest. Stuff just turns up like that."

Reading order guide
Preceded by The Truth	26th Discworld Novel	Succeeded by The Last Hero
Preceded by Hogfather	5th Death Story; Published in 2001	Succeeded by Death and What Comes Next
