= Terry Pratchett's Hogfather =

2006 British television fantasy comedy series

- Title card
- Genre: Fantasy comedy
- Created by: Terry Pratchett; Vadim Jean
- Based on: Hogfather by Terry Pratchett
- Directed by: Vadim Jean
- Starring: David Jason; Marc Warren; Michelle Dockery; Joss Ackland
- Voices of: Ian Richardson
- Narrated by: Ian Richardson
- Composers: Paul E. Francis, David A. Hughes
- Country of origin: United Kingdom
- Original language: English
- No. of episodes: 2

Production
- Executive producers: Rod Brown, Ian Sharples
- Running time: 189 minutes

Original release
- Network: Sky1
- Release: 17 December – 18 December 2006

Related
- Terry Pratchett's The Colour of Magic; Terry Pratchett's Going Postal

Terry Pratchett's Hogfather is a 2006 two-part British Christmas-themed fantasy comedy television adaptation of Hogfather by Terry Pratchett, produced by The Mob, and first broadcast on Sky1, and in High Definition on Sky1 HD, over Christmas 2006. First aired in two 1.5-hour episodes on 17 and 18 December 2006 at 20:00 UTC, it was the first live-action film adaptation of a Discworld novel. In 2007, the two episodes were rerun on Christmas Eve and Christmas Day respectively on Sky One and Sky1 HD.

Hogfather won the Best Visual Effects award at the 2007 British Academy Television Craft Awards.

== Plot ==
The series closely follows the plot of the novel, in which the Hogfather, the Discworld equivalent of Father Christmas, has gone missing and Death is forced to take his place while Death's granddaughter Susan attempts to find out what happened.

== Main cast ==
Actor	Characters
David Jason	Albert
Marc Warren	Jonathan Teatime
Michelle Dockery	Susan Sto Helit/Death of Rats (voice)
David Warner	Lord Downey
John Franklyn-Robbins	The Dean
Tony Robinson	Vernon Crumley/Bed Monster (voice)
Nigel Planer	Mr Sideney/Auditor (voice)
Peter Guinness	Medium Dave Cropper
Stephen Marcus	Banjo Cropper
Craig Conway	Wesley Chickenwire
Rhodri Meilir	Bilious
Sinead Matthews	Violet
Ian Richardson	Death (voice)/Narrator (voice)
Marnix van den Broeke	Death (body)
Shend	Hogfather
Neil Pearson	Quoth (voice)
Joss Ackland	Mustrum Ridcully
Nicholas Tennant	Corporal Nobbs
Richard Katz	Constable Visit
John Boswall	Chair of Indefinite Studies
Bridget Turner	Tooth fairy / Bogeyman

Pratchett himself has a cameo as a toymaker, in addition to his official script credit of 'Mucked About By'. Although not named in the original book or the script, Pratchett decided the toymaker was named Joshua Isme, and his shop was Toys Is Me (a play on Toys R Us). The set dressing for the toyshop included appropriate labels.

The Death of Rats was credited as played by "Dorckey Hellmice", an anagram of "Michelle Dockery".

Both Nigel Planer, who plays Sideney and the voice of the Auditors, and Tony Robinson, who plays Mr Crumley, have been the readers for many of the audiobook editions of the Discworld novels, and have both had voice acting roles in the Discworld video games.

Ian Richardson also played Francis Urquhart in the BBC series House of Cards; Death's line to Albert, You may think I've already thought of that, but I could not possibly comment, mirrors a similar phrase of Urquhart's. This would be his last role on television shown before his death.

David Jason would later go on to play Rincewind in the adaptation of The Colour of Magic.

== Production ==
=== Development ===
The storyboarding for the film was by artist Stephen Briggs, who drew The Streets of Ankh-Morpork and The Discworld Mapp. Bernard Pearson was involved with the 'look' of Ankh-Morpork. Some interior and exterior scenes were shot in Spring 2005 at Sutton House, Hackney, with extensive use of artificial snow to create winter.

=== Writing ===
Though the film was quite faithful to the novel, even in script, there were a few changes. The Death of Rats is reduced to a one-scene cameo in the film where it reaps the soul of a mouse caught in a trap on Hogswatchnight, and then watches Death deliver presents, whereas in the novel it appears much more often with Quoth the Raven. The invasion of the tooth castle is covered in more detail in the movie, as is the gathering and controlling of the teeth. The annihilation of two of Teatime's associates were removed; thus, instead of Sideney being caught in the playground of his old elementary school (with curls), he was killed by the Scissor Man, and Catseye's fear of the dark is given to Mr. Brown. The Cheerful Fairy and the Towel Wasp are both removed, along with any mention of the Money Bag Goblin by the Dean. Mention of Bibulous, the opposite brother of Bilious, is removed, and so is the Hangover Imp that is pounding Bilious' head in the scene where Susan meets him. Medium Dave and Banjo's surname in the novel is 'Lilywhite', not 'Cropper', although Teatime refers to Medium Dave as 'Mr. Lilywhite' while threatening him in the tower, and Mr. Brown refers to their mother as 'Ma Lilywhite'. 'Chickenwire' is the character's surname in the film as opposed to a nickname in the book.

The line You might think I've already thought of that, but I could not possibly comment was added to Death's dialogue with Albert in the movie. It is iconically associated with Francis Urquhart, the protagonist of House of Cards played by Death's voice actor, Ian Richardson.

=== Special effects ===
The CGI for the show was done by Moving Picture Company.

=== Promotion ===
The film premiered at the Curzon Cinema in Mayfair on Monday 27 November 2006. Part 1 and a teaser for part 2 were shown.

Beginning the second week of December, Sky began using a new Christmas ident for Sky One, Two and Three, featuring the Hogfather's sleigh and the message "Happy Hogswatch". The song "Santa Claus Is Coming to Town" was used on Hogfather radio advertisements with the word "Hogfather" replacing "Santa Claus". A "making of" documentary entitled The Whole Hog was shown on Sky One on the 10th. The film was shown on the 17 and 18 December on Sky One, and was repeated shortly afterwards on Christmas Day and Boxing Day.

== International broadcast ==
The film has been aired in numerous countries. In December 2007, Australia's Seven Network aired the film across two nights, on 23 and 24 December. French network M6 aired both parts (as Les Contes du Disque-Monde (Tales of the Discworld) on Christmas Eve 2007, while Germany's ProSieben and the United States' ION doing the same (with the original title) on Christmas Day. It was also released on DVD in a two-tiered scheme in the US, being sold exclusively at Borders from 18 November 2007 to 3 March 2008, when it was released wide. None of the extras from the British limited edition DVD are included, the only extras being an interview with Terry Pratchett and the original trailer.

== Home media ==
Terry Pratchett's Hogfather was released on DVD in the UK (R2) on 23 April 2007 in both standard and limited-edition packaging. The DVD is dedicated to the memory of Ian Richardson, who died shortly after the programme was broadcast. The making of the Hogfather is also available on iTunes as a free video podcast.

The limited-edition release is a two-disc set, with an individually numbered case and signed card from Terry Pratchett. The second disc contains special features, including:

- Deleted Scenes
  - Bilious (the oh god of Hangovers) introducing and explaining himself to Susan
  - Death and Albert discovering the altered Hogswatch card
  - Further explanation on the role of the ancient Hogfather
- 12 Days of Hogswatch (Death's Guide to Discworld)
  - A series of four 1–2-minute featurettes in which Death interviews Terry Pratchett, Stephen Briggs and others to explain various aspects of Discworld. The subjects are:

  - The Discworld
  - Death
  - Susan
  - The city of Ankh-Morpork
  - Unseen University
  - Albert
  - Nobbs and Visit
  - Mr Teatime
  - Mr Sideney
  - Hex
  - The Auditors
  - The Hogfather

- The Whole Hog: Making Terry Pratchett's Hogfather documentary

== See also ==
- List of Christmas films
