= Peter Curran (presenter) =

Radio/podcast host, writer, documentary maker

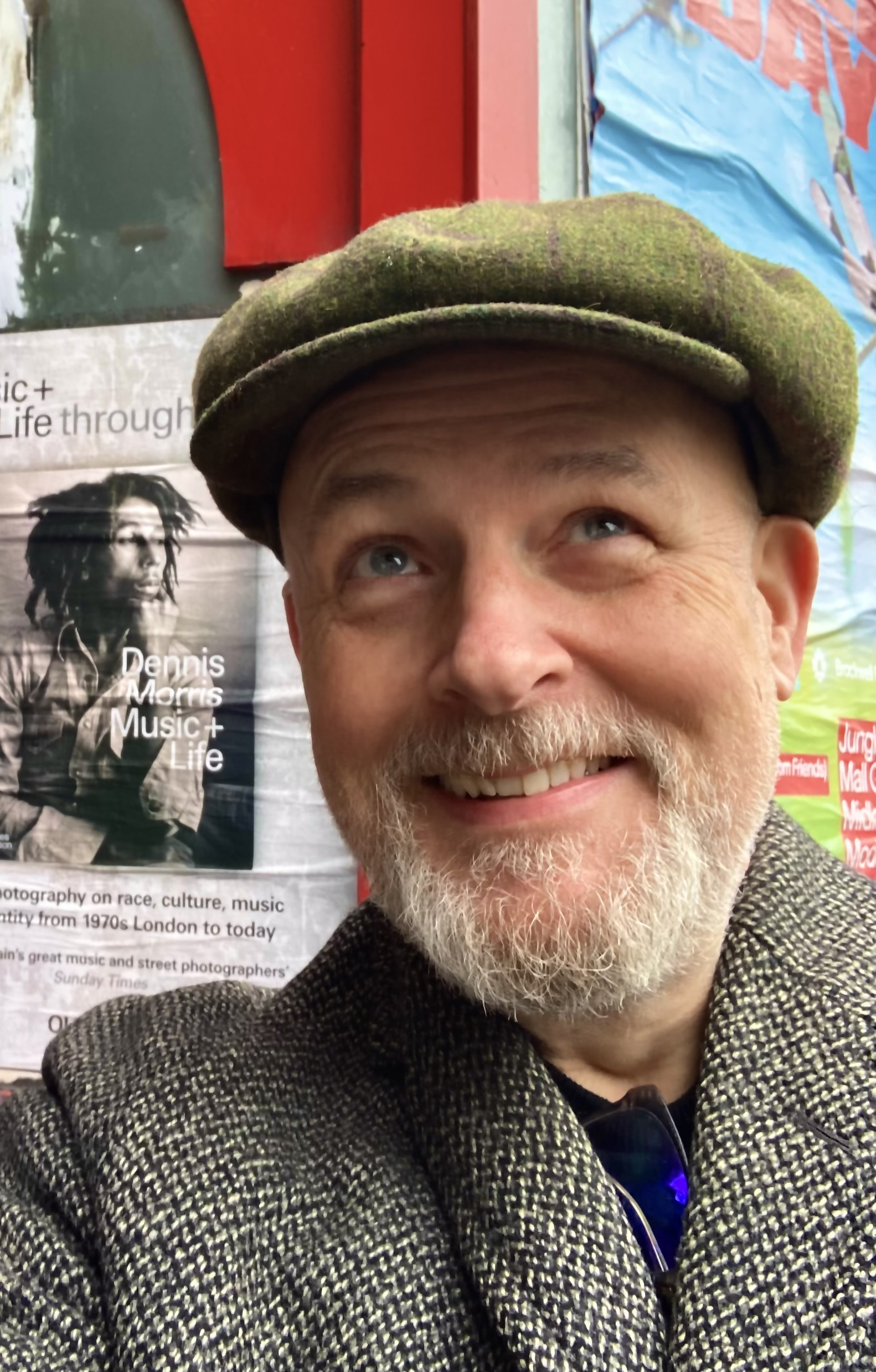
- Curran in 2025
- Born: Belfast, Northern Ireland
- Occupations: Radio/Podcast host, writer, documentary producer, narrator.

Peter Curran is a writer, documentary maker, producer, actor, and radio and podcast presenter. He grew up in Belfast as the eldest of six children. Before entering broadcasting, he worked on funfairs in the United States and later moved to London, where he played drums in various bands and worked as a site carpenter and office fitter for five years. In 1992, he retrained as a BBC reporter.

Curran co-created Bunk Bed with Patrick Marber, a long-running podcast and radio programme for BBC Sounds and BBC Radio 4. The series features late-night conversations recorded in beds and in the darkness, incorporating archive audio and guests appearances on a pull-out mattress. Guests have included Cate Blanchett, Harry Shearer, Jane Horrocks, Kathy Burke, and Andi Oliver. First broadcast on BBC Radio 4 in April 2014, Bunk Bed began its eleventh series in February 2025.

He is a regular presenter of Pick of the Week on BBC Radio 4. He produced and directed the 2022 audio drama Love Pants, which examines the turbulent and abusive relationship between singer Ian Dury and actor Jane Horrocks. The program draws on Horrocks' diaries and Dury's letters and features original music by Mick Gallagher.

In 2012, Curran co-founded audiobook publisher Talking Music. The company acquired the rights to Revolution in the Head: The Beatles' Records and the Sixties by Ian McDonald and subsequently published audiobooks on artists and movements including Eminem, Jimi Hendrix, Acid house, The Coasters, The Beatles, Glam rock, Adele, and The Clash. These works were written and read by authors such as Charles Shaar Murray, Jane Bussmann, and Barney Hoskyns.

Curran's journalism on contemporary Irish history includes the BBC television essays Maiden City Voyage, described as a social and cultural audit of Derry during its tenure as UK City of Culture, and Slack Sabbath, which explores changes in religious observance since 1970's. For BBC Radio 4, his work includes Collecting the Troubles At The Ulster Museum, contributions to the One To One series, and the 2022 program The Past Is a Foreign Country.

For the UK's World War One commemoration program 14–18 NOW, Curran was commissioned to explore the experience of communities in Ireland's future border regions before and after the First World War. The Art of Border Living, produced in collaboration with the Verbal Arts Centre, comprised live events at the Belfast Film Festival and Dublin, the BBC documentary Stories From The Home Front, and a series of podcasts featuring commissioned short stories by authors including Kamila Shamsie, Nuala Ní Chonchúir, and Paul McVeigh.

Curran wrote and presented a BBC Radio 4 documentary examining John Hersey's 1946 Hiroshima article for The New Yorker. This was followed by a rebroadcast of the BBC's 1948 transmission of the article in its entirety, which had been among the first broadcasts to describe in detail the human consequences of atomic bomb radiation.

He has reported from South Africa, India and the USA for From Our Own Correspondent. In Spirit of the Midnight Sun, Curran explored the effects of climate change on nomadic Sámi reindeer herders in Finnmark and on the coastal Sámi community of Varangerfjord in northern Norway.

== Career ==
After running an office-fitting company in London and working part-time as an actor during the late 1980s, Curran retrained as a BBC Reporter. In 1992, he began presenting full-time on BBC Greater London Radio (BBC GLR). From 1994, he hosted a daily music and arts drivetime program featuring live sessions by artists including Radiohead, Sheryl Crow, Wu Tang Clan, and Nick Cave, alongside record reviews and profile interviews with authors, filmmakers, and comedians. The Peter Curran Show ran for six years until 2000, when BBC London replaced the 4:00–6:00 pm slot with a news and phone-in format.

Curran later hosted BBC London's movie programme The Big Picture for two years and contributed film reviews to Sight and Sound magazine.

In television, he has presented a wide range of arts and culture programmes, including Personal Passions, When Art Went Pop, and Edinburgh Nights on BBC2. He also presented Channel 4's media program Wired World, Discovery Channel's architecture and engineering series Building The Best, Restoration Nation, and the 40-part BBC arts education series Culture Fix, aimed at audiences under 30.

As an independent documentary maker, Curran brought together Nick Leeson, his former boss Peter Norris, and former colleagues for the first time since Leeson's role in the collapse of Barings Bank, in a widely noted edition of The Reunion on BBC Radio 4. He also produced the celebrity online television series Teaching Challenge for Brook Lapping and directed five series of the program between 2007 and 2011.

During 2017 and 2018, Curran travelled across the United States for the series Litter From America, which featured the reflections of actor Richard Schiff, comedian Maysoon Zayid, and director Kwame Kwei-Armah on creativity, identity, and political change in the contemporary United States.

Curran made his television debut in 1998, presenting the first UK television programmes to feature streaming video and an interactive website. The program focused on developments in the internet, technology and digital culture. They were produced by Stephen Wilkinson for Open University, recorded in London's Cybercafe, and broadcast on BBC2.

Curran has scripted and presented numerous live audience programs for radio, including Loose Ends, Some Kind of Man, and The Arts Show on BBC Radio 2. He co-wrote Spinal Tap: Back From the Dead, a faux-documentary featuring the original cast of the movie This Is Spinal Tap, and presented The Tribes of Science for BBC Radio 4

Other notable projects include The Foghorn: A Celebration and The Electric Ride, produced for BBC Radio 4 and BBC Online. For The Electric Ride, Curran travelled approximately 5,000 miles through seven European countries in an electric car, relying on local residents to recharge the vehicle every 100 miles.

In April 2023, Curran joined the presenting team of the long-running BBC Radio programme Saturday Live.

Working with producer Tony Phillips, Curran also presented an audio history of Irish and African communities in the Caribbean dating back to 1543. The program, 'No Blacks, No Irish..', was described as 'fascinating and shocking'. and examined the historical roots and later usage of the slogan “No Blacks, No Irish, No Dogs,” which appeared in the windows of some boarding houses, pubs, and rental accommodation in the United Kingdom during the mid-20th century.
