= Peter Curran (astronomer) =

Irish astronomer (1977–2016)

Peter A. Curran
- Born: 27 July 1977; Cork, Ireland
- Died: 18 February 2016 (aged 38); Perth, Australia
- Education: University of Amsterdam
- Scientific career
- Fields: Astronomy
- Doctoral advisor: Ralph A.M.J. Wijers

Peter A. Curran (27 July 1977 – 18 February 2016) was an Irish astronomer, known for his work on gamma-ray bursts, stellar black holes and the Peter Curran Award.

== Early life ==
Curran was born and grew up in Cork, Ireland. He received a B.Sc. degree in physics from the University College Cork in 1999, and an M.Sc. degree in astronomy in 2002, working on "Infrared Observations of Intense Galactic X-ray Sources".

== Career ==
Between 1999 and 2004 Curran was an assistant lecturer in physics at the Department of Applied Physics and Instrumentation, Cork Institute of Technology, Cork, Ireland. He joined the Anton Pannekoek Institute for Astronomy at the University of Amsterdam, Netherlands where he developed his research into gamma-ray bursts (GRBs) and obtained a PhD degree in 2008. He continued theoretical and observational research on the physics of GRBs as a staff at the Mullard Space Science Laboratory, University College London and as an Honorary Visiting Fellow at the University of Leicester.

Curran joined the International Centre for Radio Astronomy Research (ICRAR) at the Curtin University's Institute of Radio Astronomy in 2012. In 2015 he was awarded a prestigious Senior Curtin University Fellowship developing an outstanding profile in the field of accretion physics.

Curran was the inaugural chair of the ICRAR's Curtin University Node's development and STEM equity committee, which led to the first Australian Bronze Pleiades award received by the institute in 2014.

Curran died of cancer in 2016.

== Legacy ==
Curtin University began awarding the Peter Curran Memorial Fellowship for Radio Astronomy Research in 2016.

The Astronomical Science Group of Ireland established the annual Peter Curran Award for Best Post-Graduate Contribution to the Irish National Astronomy Meeting (INAM), first presented in September 2016.
