= Reaper Man =

1991 Discworld novel by Terry Pratchett

- First edition
- Author: Terry Pratchett
- Cover artist: Josh Kirby
- Language: English
- Series: Discworld; 11th novel – 2nd Death story
- Subject: Alien invasion, science fiction, "Man with No Name" Westerns, modernization, shopping malls, minority rights movements; Characters: Death, Unseen University staff; Locations: Ankh-Morpork, Octarine Grass Country
- Genre: Fantasy
- Publisher: Victor Gollancz
- Publication date: 1991
- ISBN: 0-575-04979-0
- Preceded by: Moving Pictures
- Followed by: Witches Abroad

Reaper Man is a fantasy novel by British writer Terry Pratchett. Published in 1991, it is the 11th Discworld novel and the second to focus on Death. The title is a reference to Alex Cox's movie Repo Man.

== Plot ==
The Auditors of Reality, formless entities who ensure the universe operates efficiently, decide that Discworld's Death needs to be replaced because he has developed a personality. They get permission from a supreme being called Azrael and force Death to retire. They give him a timer with a finite amount of sand representing his own life. Death, relieved of his duties, goes to a village in the Octarine Grass Country and works as a farmhand for an elderly Miss Flitworth. He takes the name "Bill Door". In this village community, Death learns more about humans, friendship, the experiences of living and the value of life–some of this he struggled to understand when he was immortal and performing his duties.

Death's absence from his role results in the life force of dead humans building up because they no longer have a place to go. This results in poltergeist activity, ghosts, and other paranormal phenomena. Most notable among them is the recently deceased wizard Windle Poons in Ankh-Morpork, who is now a zombie. After several misadventures, including being accosted by his Unseen University wizard colleagues, he finds himself attending the Fresh Start Club, an undead-rights group. His wizard peers, on their part, investigate the stranger phenomena occurring in the city. The Fresh Start Club and the wizards discover that the city is being invaded by a parasitic life form that feeds on cities and ultimately turns into a giant shopping mall. Together, they destroy it.

When humankind's collective fear eventually creates a New Death, one without any form or personality, it comes to take Bill Door whose time has run out. Door, having planned for this moment, outwits and destroys it. Having defeated the New Death, Door takes back his form as Death and confronts Azrael, who is the Death of all things across the Universes, and thus, his superior. The Auditors watch Death's victory and protest to Azrael, saying that he has committed multiple crimes against the order of the universe. Death pleads to Azrael that Deaths have to care or they do not exist and there is nothing but Oblivion, which must also end some time.

Death asks for and receives some time. He meets up with Miss Flitworth again with gifts and offers to take her anywhere she wanted. Realizing that the time of her death has come, she asks to go to the local harvest dance. After enjoying herself, she realizes she had died hours before the dance even started. Death escorts her to her old fiancé, who had died in an accident before their marriage could take place, and the couple are reunited for their final rest. Death resumes his duties and returns to the city of Ankh-Morpork. Death meets up with Windle Poons, finally taking him to his afterlife.

== Characters ==
- Death / Bill Door
- Renata Flitworth
- Auditors of Reality
- Azrael
- New Death
- Death of Rats
- Windle Poons
- Mustrum Ridcully
- The Librarian
- The Senior Wrangler
- The Dean
- The Bursar
- The Lecturer in Recent Runes
- Lupine
- Ludmilla Cake
- Mrs. Cake
- Reg Shoe
- Schleppel
- Mr. Ixolite
- Arthur Winkings (Count Notfaroutoe)
- Doreen Winkings (Countess Notfaroutoe)

== Adaptations ==
A fragment of this book was adapted in 1996 into a short animated movie entitled Welcome to the Discworld, featuring Christopher Lee as Death.

Reading order guide
Preceded by Moving Pictures	11th Discworld Novel	Succeeded by Witches Abroad
Preceded by Mort	2nd Death Story; Published in 1991	Succeeded by Soul Music
