= Patrick Marber =

English comedian, playwright, director

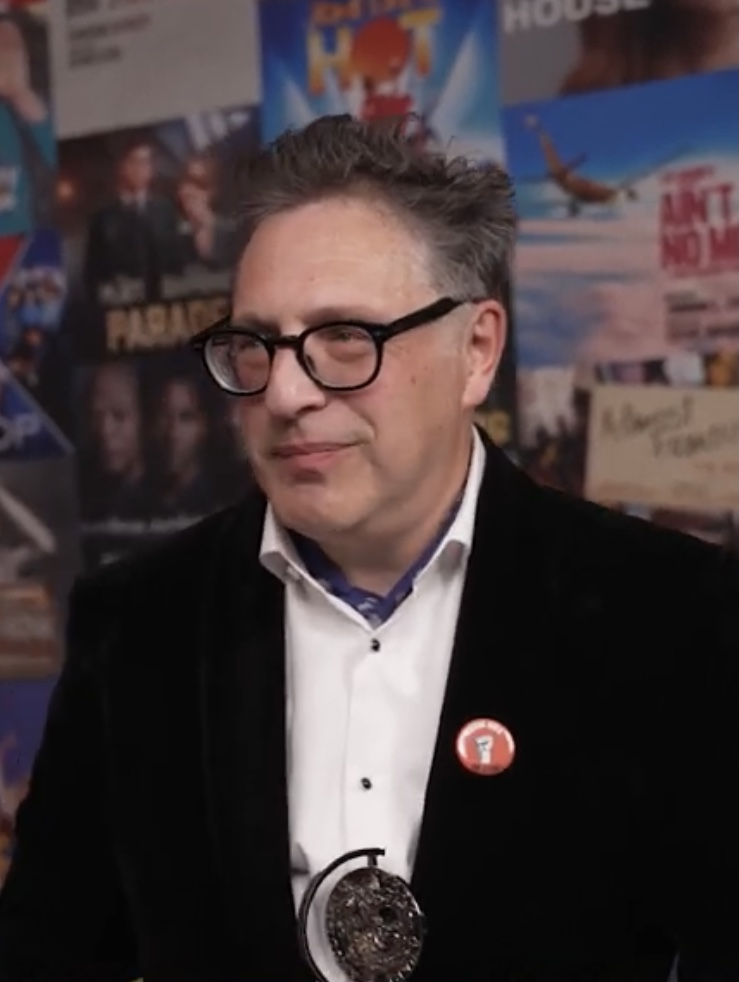
- Marber at the 76th Tony Awards in 2023
- Born: Patrick Albert Crispin Marber; 19 September 1964 (age 62); London, England, UK
- Education: Wadham College, Oxford (BA)
- Occupations: Comedian, playwright, director, actor, screenwriter
- Spouse: Debra Gillett (m. 2002)
- Children: 3

Patrick Albert Crispin Marber (born 19 September 1964) is an English comedian, playwright, director, actor, and screenwriter. He was elected a Fellow of the Royal Society of Literature in 2002.

== Early life ==
Marber was born and raised in a middle-class Jewish family in Wimbledon, London, the son of Angela (Benjamin), a theatre secretary, and Brian Marber, a technical analyst. He was educated at Rokeby School, St Paul's School, Cranleigh School, and Wadham College, Oxford where he studied English.

== Career ==
=== Comedy performer ===
After working for a few years as a stand-up comedian, primarily as part of a comedy double act with author Guy Browning, Marber became a writer and cast member on the radio shows On the Hour and Knowing Me, Knowing You, and their television spinoffs The Day Today and Knowing Me, Knowing You... with Alan Partridge. Amongst other roles, Marber portrayed hapless reporter Peter O'Hanraha-hanrahan in both On the Hour and The Day Today, and was involved in a dispute with the comedians Stewart Lee and Richard Herring, who had written for On the Hour, about who had invented the character. Lee and Herring's TV show Fist of Fun would later make several references to their feud with Marber, calling him a "Cornish curmudgeon". In Stewart Lee's 2010 book, How I Escaped My Certain Fate, Marber is referred to as a "new Shakespeare". Marber reunited with the Knowing Me, Knowing You team in 2003 to record commentaries for the DVD release of the show. He also contributed some new in-character audio material to the DVD release of The Day Today in 2004.

He co-writes Bunk Bed for BBC Radio 4, which he created with Peter Curran. It was first broadcast during April 2014, with the fifth series broadcast in 2018, with special guest Jane Horrocks.

=== Plays and direction ===
Marber's first play was Dealer's Choice, which he also directed. Set in a restaurant and based around a game of poker (and partly inspired by his own experiences with gambling addiction), it opened at the National Theatre in February 1995, and won the 1995 Evening Standard Theatre Award for Best Comedy.

After Miss Julie, a version of the Strindberg play Miss Julie, was broadcast on BBC television in the same year. In this, Marber moves the action to Britain in 1945, at the time of the Labour Party's victory in the general election, with Miss Julie as the daughter of a Labour peer. A stage version, directed by Michael Grandage, was first performed 2003 at the Donmar Warehouse, London by Kelly Reilly, Richard Coyle and Helen Baxendale. It later had a production at the American Airlines Theatre on Broadway in 2009.

His play Closer, a comedy of sex, dishonesty, and betrayal, opened at the National Theatre in 1997, again directed by Marber. This too won the Evening Standard award for Best Comedy, as well as the Critics' Circle Theatre Awards and Laurence Olivier awards for Best New Play. It has proved to be an international success, having been translated into thirty languages. A film adaptation, written by Marber, was released in 2004, directed by Mike Nichols and starring Julia Roberts, Jude Law, Natalie Portman, and Clive Owen.

In Howard Katz, his next play, Marber presented very different subject matter: a middle-aged man struggling with life, death and religion. This was first performed in 2001, again at the National Theatre, but was less favourably received by the critics and has been less of a commercial success than some of his other work. A new production by the Roundabout Theatre Company opened Off-Broadway in March 2007, with Alfred Molina in the title role. A play for young people, The Musicians, about a school orchestra's visit to Russia, was performed for the National Theatre's Shell Connections programme in 2004, its first production being at the Sydney Opera House.

Don Juan in Soho, his contemporary rendering of Molière's comedy Dom Juan, opened at the Donmar Warehouse in 2006, directed by Michael Grandage and with Rhys Ifans in the lead role.

He also co-wrote the screenplay for Asylum (2005), directed by David Mackenzie, and was sole screenwriter for the film Notes on a Scandal (2006), for which he was nominated for an Oscar at the 79th Academy Awards.

In June 2015, his play, The Red Lion, opened at the National Theatre.

In 2016 he directed a revival of Tom Stoppard's play Travesties at the Menier Chocolate Factory in London which, after a sell-out run, transferred with the same cast to the Apollo Theatre in the West End. The revival was nominated for five Olivier Awards and in spring 2018 it transferred to Broadway with Marber directing at the American Airlines Theatre.

Marber's theatre directing credits include Blue Remembered Hills by Dennis Potter, (National Theatre), The Old Neighbourhood by David Mamet, (Royal Court Theatre, London) and The Caretaker by Harold Pinter, (Comedy Theatre, London). In 2004, Marber was Cameron Mackintosh Professor of Contemporary Theatre at Oxford University.

He directed Tom Stoppard's play Leopoldstadt, set in the Jewish community of early 20th-century Vienna, which premiered at Wyndham's Theatre in 2020. The play closed during the pandemic and re-opened on 7 August 2021 for a 12 week run, ending on 30 October 2021. Leopoldstadt had its North American premiere at the Longacre Theatre on Broadway on 2 October 2022, with Marber directing, for which he won the Tony Award for Best Direction of a Play. He directed Alan Bennett's Habeas Corpus from 3 December 2021 to 26 February 2022 at the Menier Chocolate Factory; the run was also delayed because of the COVID-19 pandemic.

=== Other activities ===
Marber was a director of Lewes FC, driving forward a scheme for the club to be community owned from July 2010.

== Personal life ==
Since 2002, Marber has been married to actress Debra Gillett. They have three children.

== Work ==
=== Television (incomplete) ===
As writer

- Paul Calf's Video Diary (1993) – co-writer.
- Pauline Calf's Wedding Video (1994) – co-writer.
- The Day Today (1994) – co-writer.
- Coogan's Run – co-writer for two episodes: Natural Born Quizzers and The Curator. Also director of The Curator.
- After Miss Julie (1995) – also director. Adaptation of August Strindberg's Miss Julie.
- Knowing Me, Knowing You with Alan Partridge (1995, 1996) – co-writer.

As director

- After Miss Julie (1995) – also writer. Adaptation of August Strindberg's Miss Julie.
- The Curator (1995) – episode 6 of Coogan's Run.

=== Theatre ===
As writer

- Dealer's Choice (1995)
- Closer (1997)
- Howard Katz (2001)
- NT25 Chain Play (2001) – created for The National Theatre's 25th anniversary, featuring 25 scenes each written by a different playwright, with Marber writing Scene 14. The script was published on the National Theatre's website.
- After Miss Julie (2003) – first presented on BBC television in 1995. Adaptation of August Strindberg's Miss Julie.
- The Musicians (2004)
- Don Juan in Soho (2006, 2017) – adaptation of Molière's Dom Juan.
- Trelawny of the 'Wells' (2013) – by Arthur Wing Pinero with "ornamentation" by Patrick Marber.
- The Red Lion (2015, 2018)
- Three Days in the Country (2015) – adaptation of Ivan Turgenev's A Month in the Country.
- Hedda Gabler (2016) – adaptation of Henrick Ibsen's play of the same name, from a literal translation by Karin and Ann Bamborough.
- The School Film (2017)
- Exit the King (2018) – adaptation of Eugène Ionesco's play of the same name.

As director

- Steve Coogan and John Thomson in Character (1992)
- Dealer's Choice (1995) – also writer.
- 1953 – written by Craig Raine.
- Blue Remembered Hills (1996) – written by Dennis Potter.
- Closer (1997) – also writer.
- The Old Neighborhood (1998) – written by David Mamet.
- The Caretaker (2000) – written by Harold Pinter.
- Howard Katz (2001) – also writer.
- I Remember the Royal Court (2006) – devised piece.
- Three Days in the Country (2015) – also writer. Adaptation of Ivan Turgenev's A Month in the Country.
- Travesties (2016, 2017, 2018) – written by Tom Stoppard.
- Don Juan in Soho (2017) – also writer. Adaptation of Molière's Dom Juan.
- Venus in Fur (2017) – written by David Ives.
- Exit the King (2018) – also writer. Adaptation of Eugène Ionesco's play of the same name.
- Pinter 5 (2019) – revue of three of Harold Pinter's one-act plays: The Room, Victoria Station and Family Voices.
- Leopoldstadt (2020, 2021) – written by Tom Stoppard.
- Habeas Corpus (2021) – written by Alan Bennett.
- What We Talk About When We Talk About Anne Frank (2024) – written by Nathan Englander.
- The Producers (2024) – written by Mel Brooks and Thomas Meehan, based on the 1967 film.
- Glengarry Glen Ross (2025) – written by David Mamet.

=== Film ===
As writer

- Old Street (2004) – short film.
- Closer (2004) – screenplay adapted by Marber from his 1997 play of the same name.
- Asylum (2005) – screenplay adapted by Marber from Patrick McGrath's novel of the same name.
- Notes on a Scandal (2006) – screenplay adapted by Marber from Zoë Heller's novel of the same name.
- Love You More (2008) – short film.
- The Critic (2023) – screenplay adapted by Marber from Anthony Quinn's novel Curtain Call.
- What Happens at Night (TBA) – screenplay adapted from Peter Cameron's novel of the same name.
