= Soul Music (novel) =

1994 Discworld novel by Terry Pratchett

- First edition
- Author: Terry Pratchett
- Cover artist: Josh Kirby
- Language: English
- Series: Discworld; 16th novel – 3rd Death story
- Subject: Rock music and related mythologising; Characters: Death, Susan, Imp y Celyn, Glod Glodsson, Lias Bluestone; Locations: Ankh-Morpork, Death's Domain, Quirm
- Genre: Fantasy
- Publisher: Victor Gollancz
- Publication date: 1994
- ISBN: 0-575-05504-9
- Preceded by: Men at Arms
- Followed by: Interesting Times

Soul Music is a fantasy novel by British writer Terry Pratchett, the sixteenth book in the Discworld series, first published in 1994. Like many of Pratchett's novels it introduces an element of modern society into the magical and vaguely late medieval, early modern world of the Discworld, in this case Rock and Roll music and stardom, with near disastrous consequences. It also introduces Susan Sto Helit, daughter of Mort and Ysabell and granddaughter of Death.

== Plot summary ==
A young harpist, Imp Y Celyn from Llamedos ("sod 'em all" spelled backwards, a reference to Dylan Thomas' Under Milk Wood), comes to Ankh-Morpork in hopes of becoming famous. Unable to afford the Musicians Guild fees, he and fellow unlicensed musicians Lias Bluestone (a troll percussionist) and Glod Glodsson (a dwarf hornblower) form "The Band with Rocks In", named after Lias' tuned rocks. When Imp's harp is destroyed, he acquires a guitar from a mysterious shop, unaware that it contains the awareness of a primordial music that was responsible for bringing the universe into existence. Imp takes the new name "Buddy" ("Imp Y Celyn" literally means "bud of holly"), and Lias starts calling himself "Cliff".

Meanwhile, Death is upset over the deaths of his adopted daughter Ysabell and her husband, his former apprentice Mort. Their daughter, Susan Sto Helit, was initially raised with an awareness of Death as her grandfather, but they later withheld the truth from her and she forgot about it. She attends boarding school in Quirm, and is content to avoid unpleasant conversations by using her unexplained ability to fade from others' awareness. When Death abandons his post for an impromptu sabbatical in an effort to forget the painful memories, the fabric of reality forces Susan to take on his duties and she begins to remember her past. She becomes aware of Buddy when he is scheduled to die in a riot while performing at the Mended Drum, but instead the crowd is overcome by the spirit of "Music with Rocks In", which apparently has no musical merit for objective listeners not themselves possessed by it. After this, Buddy's life is powered by the music instead of by his natural life force.

Cut-Me-Own-Throat Dibbler becomes the Band's manager. He hires the troll Asphalt as a roadie to accompany the band on its tour as he books them to play to increasingly larger crowds, all the while keeping them unaware of the large profits he is earning. Buddy becomes less and less like himself, and barely seems aware of his surroundings when he is not playing the guitar. Susan tries to protect him from the influence of the music; though she does not acknowledge it, she has developed feelings for him. Meanwhile, the music is affecting many of the people who have heard it, causing them to form their own bands and adopt behaviours associated with the fans of various musical movements on 20th Century Earth. The wizards of Unseen University are particularly affected by this phenomenon, though not Archchancellor Ridcully, who uses the newly invented device Hex and works with Susan in an effort to understand these events. Mr Clete, the murderous secretary of the Musicians Guild, becomes increasingly unhinged by his inability to stop the Band's unauthorised activities (as they are protected by the music).

Buddy wants to perform a free concert at the music's behest, and Dibbler agrees after realising how much of a profit he can earn through merchandising and concessions. A large number of the copycat bands participate in the largest concert of all time, culminating in the Band with Rocks In's performance. Buddy performs his own folk song on his harp, which Glod has had repaired, which briefly restores Imp's natural personality. Afterwards, the band flees from their crazed fans, pursued by the Musicians Guild, Dibbler, Susan, and Death (who has been brought back to his senses by his servant Albert). The music intends to create an immortal legend by crashing the band's coach into a gorge, with no survivors. Susan rescues them, but the music begins to alter the timeline so the band will have died. Death arrives and plays an "empty chord" on the guitar to stop the music, explaining that while he can stop it, only a musician like Buddy can restart it. The music agrees to allow Buddy to live in return for his playing a chord to restart it. Death then destroys the guitar.

A new timeline is created in which Clete was the only fatality, although Susan remains aware of the original course of events. She returns to school with a new self-assurance. The next day, she runs to reunite with Imp upon realising that, in the new version of events, he came to Quirm instead of Ankh-Morpork and is working nearby.

== Characters ==
The Band With Rocks In:

- Imp y Celyn: Member (lead vocals & eclectric whatzit) whose name translates to "Bud of the Holly" as a nod to the singer Buddy Holly
- Glod Glodsson: Member (Horn)
- Lias Bluestone: Member (Percussion)
- The Librarian: Short-term member (Organ)
- Asphalt: Roadie
- CMOT Dibbler: Manager

The DEATH family and associates:

- DEATH
- Susan Sto-Helit: granddaughter
- Mort: former apprentice
- Ysabell: daughter
- Binky: pale horse
- DEATH of Rats
- Albert: Butler
- Quoth the Raven

Ankh-Morpork Musicians Guild:

- Mr Clete
- Mr Satchelmouth Lemon
- Herbert Shuffle
- Grisham Frord Close Harmony Singers

The Wizards:

- ArchChancellor Mustrum Ridcully
- The Librarian
- The Dean
- The Bursar
- Lecturer in Recent Runes
- Senior Wrangler
- Chair of Indefinite Studies
- Ponder Stibbons
- Adrian Turnipseed

== Appearance in other media ==
An animated adaptation was produced by Cosgrove Hall Films for Channel 4 in 1996. It takes the association of the "Band with Rocks In" with the Beatles even further than the book does, evolving their style from 1950s rock and early 1960s beat music (and mixing-bowl haircuts) in Ankh-Morpork, to acid rock in Scrote, to spiritual hippie rock in Quirm. In Sto Lat, they sound like the Jimi Hendrix Experience or Bad Company, but are dressed in clothes similar to the Beatles on the cover of the Sgt. Pepper's Lonely Hearts Club Band album. Also in Quirm, Buddy says that the band is 'more popular than cheeses', referring to John Lennon's famous quote proclaiming the Beatles to be more popular than Jesus. In Pseudopolis, their outfits and style resemble the Blues Brothers. Crash's band is also given the name "Socks Pastels".

The soundtrack was released on CD, mp3 and streaming.

In August 2014, an adaptation was performed at the Rose Theatre, Kingston by Youth Music Theatre UK. The musical has been adapted by stand-up comedian Andrew Doyle with original music by Craig Adams. Soul Music will be directed by Luke Sheppard (associate director of Matilda the Musical and director of In the Heights) at the Southwark Playhouse and choreographed by Cressida Carré.

== Sources ==
- Pratchett, Terry (1994) [1999]. Soul Music. Gollancz. Hardcover: ISBN 978-0-575-05504-9
- Pratchett, Terry (1995). Soul Music. Harper Prism. ISBN 9780061052033. Hardcover: ISBN 978-0-06-105203-3
- Pratchett, Terry (1995). Soul Music. Harpercollins. ISBN 9780061052033. Paperback: ISBN 978-0-06-105489-1
- Pratchett, Terry (1995). Soul Music. Corgi. Paperback: ISBN 978-0-552-14029-4
- Pratchett, Terry (1997). Soul Music. ISIS Large Print Books. Largeprint: ISBN 978-0-7531-5157-0
- Pratchett, Terry (2005). Soul Music. Corgi Adult. Paperback: ISBN 978-0-552-15319-5

Reading order guide
Preceded by Men at Arms	16th Discworld Novel	Succeeded by Interesting Times
Preceded by Reaper Man	3rd Death Story; Published in 1994	Succeeded by Hogfather
