= Michelle Dockery =

British actress (born 1981)

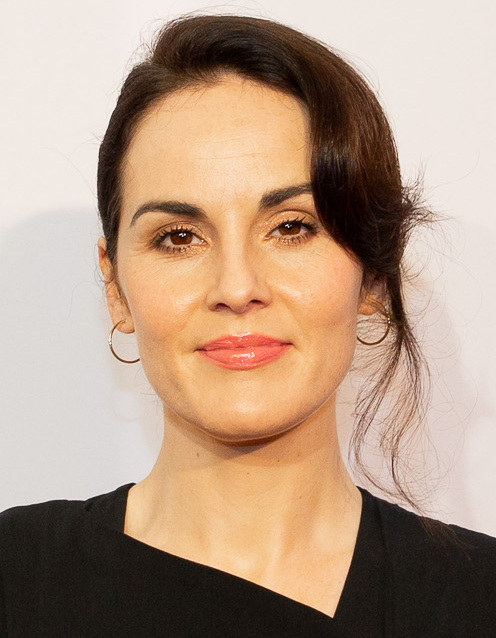
- Dockery in 2019
- Born: Michelle Suzanne Dockery; 15 December 1981 (age 44); Romford, England
- Education: Guildhall School of Music and Drama
- Occupation: Actress
- Years active: 2004–present
- Spouse: Jasper Waller-Bridge (m. 2023)
- Children: 1
- Relatives: Phoebe Waller-Bridge (sister-in-law); Isobel Waller-Bridge (sister-in-law)

Signature
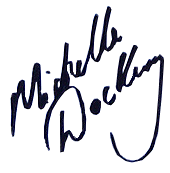

Michelle Suzanne Dockery (born 15 December 1981) is an English actress, best known for starring as Lady Mary Crawley in the ITV television period drama series Downton Abbey (2010–2015), for which she was nominated for a Golden Globe Award and three consecutive Primetime Emmy Awards for Outstanding Lead Actress in a Drama Series. She reprised her role in the films Downton Abbey (2019), Downton Abbey: A New Era (2022) and Downton Abbey: The Grand Finale (2025).

After graduating from the Guildhall School of Music and Drama, Dockery made her professional stage debut in His Dark Materials in 2004. For her role as Eliza Doolittle in a 2007 London revival of Pygmalion, she was nominated for the Evening Standard Award. For her role in the 2009 play Burnt by the Sun, she earned an Olivier Award nomination for Best Supporting Actress.

Dockery has appeared in the films Hanna (2011), Anna Karenina (2012), Non-Stop (2014), and The Gentlemen (2019). She has also played lead roles in the western miniseries Godless (2017), for which she received her fourth Emmy nomination, and the drama miniseries Defending Jacob (2020) and Anatomy of a Scandal (2022).

== Early life and education ==
Michelle Suzanne Dockery is the daughter of Lorraine, a care home assistant from Stepney, London, and Michael Dockery, an analytical chemist from Ireland. She grew up in Romford, Greater London.

She attended the Finch Stage School, and graduated from the Guildhall School of Music & Drama in 2004.

== Career ==
=== Stage ===
Dockery was a member of the National Youth Theatre. She made her professional debut in His Dark Materials at the Royal National Theatre in 2004. In 2006, she was nominated for the Ian Charleson Award for her performance as Dina Dorf in Pillars of the Community at the National Theatre. She appeared in Burnt by the Sun at the National Theatre, for which she received an Olivier Award nomination for Best Supporting Actress.

She won second prize at the Ian Charleson Awards for her performance as Eliza Doolittle in Peter Hall's production of Pygmalion at the Theatre Royal, Bath, which toured the UK and transferred to The Old Vic in 2008, and for the same production was nominated Best Newcomer at the Evening Standard Awards 2008.

In 2010, she played Ophelia in Hamlet at the Crucible Theatre alongside John Simm.

=== Film and television ===
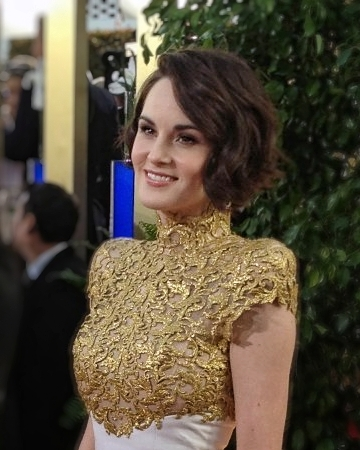
Dockery at the 2013 Golden Globe Awards

In 2006, Dockery starred as Susan Sto Helit in a two-part adaptation of Terry Pratchett's novel Hogfather. In 2008, she played Kathryn in Channel 4's The Red Riding Trilogy and played the guest role of tormented rape victim Gemma Morrison in BBC's Waking the Dead. In 2009, she appeared on the BBC as Erminia, a ward of Jonathan Pryce's character, in the two-part Cranford Christmas special (also known as Return to Cranford), and as the young governess in an adaptation of The Turn of the Screw, opposite her future Downton Abbey co-star Dan Stevens in the role of her psychiatrist.

Dockery came to public prominence in 2010 when she played Lady Mary Crawley in Julian Fellowes' series Downton Abbey. The series ran from 2010 to 2015. Each year it was filmed from February to August and broadcast on ITV from September to November, with a special Christmas night episode each year beginning in 2011. It later aired in the U.S. on PBS.

For her role as Lady Mary Crawley in the Downton Abbey series, Dockery received three consecutive Emmy Award nominations in the category of Outstanding Lead Actress In a Drama Series, in 2012, 2013, and 2014. She also earned a Golden Globe nomination in 2013.

Dockery's first big screen role was as False Marissa in Hanna (2011). In 2012, she appeared as Princess Myagkaya in the film adaptation of Anna Karenina and starred with Charlotte Rampling in a two-part dramatisation of William Boyd's spy thriller Restless on BBC One. In January 2014, she appeared in the action thriller feature film Non-Stop alongside co-stars Liam Neeson, Julianne Moore, and Lupita Nyong'o.

In 2014, Dockery was made Fellow of the Guildhall School in recognition of her achievements in television. In 2014, Dockery was listed in The Sunday Times Britain's 500 Most Influential People, which is a compilation of the most significant individuals in the UK who have demonstrated outstanding qualities of influence, achievement and inspiration.

In a departure from her portrayal of Lady Mary in Downton Abbey, Dockery advanced her Hollywood career with a 2015 performance in the sci-fi thriller feature film Self/less, with Ryan Reynolds.

Beginning in November 2016, Dockery starred in the lead role of Letty Raines in Good Behavior, an American drama series based on the novella series by Blake Crouch. Letty is a drug-addicted thief and con-artist who, released early from prison on good behaviour, is attempting to get her life under control. Her efforts are complicated by a chance meeting and subsequent entanglement with a charismatic hitman, played by Juan Diego Botto. The 10-episode first season, airing on a U.S. basic-cable network TNT, was filmed in and around Wilmington, North Carolina. In January 2017, the show was picked up for a second season. In November 2018, the series was cancelled after two seasons.

In 2017, Dockery appeared alongside Jim Broadbent, Charlotte Rampling, Harriet Walter, and Emily Mortimer in the British film The Sense of an Ending from CBS Films, based on the Booker-winning novel of the same name by Julian Barnes. She plays Susie Webster, the daughter of Tony Webster (Jim Broadbent), a man who lives in quiet unquestioning solitude until he confronts secrets of his past. "The film is a beautiful adaptation of the book which I love. And I jumped at the chance to work with director Ritesh Batra, who also filmed The Lunchbox (2013)", explained Dockery.

Later that year, Dockery had a lead role in the Netflix western miniseries Godless. In 2019, Dockery reprised her lead role as Lady Mary Crawley in the Downton Abbey film, alongside Hugh Bonneville and Maggie Smith. The film received generally positive reviews from critics and was a financial success, grossing $192 million. She continued to portray Lady Mary in the films' subsequent sequels. Later in 2019, Dockery appeared in The Gentlemen, directed by Guy Ritchie, as the wife of a drug baron played by Matthew McConaughey. The film opened in wide release in 2020 and has grossed more than $100 million worldwide. It was met with mixed to positive reviews.

=== Music ===
Dockery is a trained singer. She sang at the 50th anniversary of Ronnie Scott's Jazz Club in London and has occasionally sung with Sadie and the Hotheads, a band formed by Elizabeth McGovern, who played her mother in Downton Abbey. In February 2022, it was announced that Dockery and her Downton Abbey co-star Michael C. Fox had signed a record deal with Decca Records as the duo Michelle and Michael. The duo's singles "The Watching Silence" and "Starlight" reached numbers 7 and 24, respectively, on the UK Physical Singles Chart.

== Charity work ==
On World Humanitarian Day 2014, Oxfam announced Dockery as its first ever Humanitarian Ambassador. Dockery is also a patron of Changing Faces, as well as other charities.

In 2014, Dockery was one of nine British celebrities featured in a short film promoting Stand Up to Cancer UK.

== Personal life ==
Dockery began a relationship with John Dineen (1981–2015), from Waterfall, Ireland, in 2013. Dockery had been introduced to Dineen, then a public relations director at FTI Consulting in London, by Irish actor Allen Leech, who appeared alongside Dockery in Downton Abbey. Dineen died on 13 December 2015, aged 34, from a rare form of cancer at the Marymount Hospice in Cork.

Dockery began a relationship with Jasper Waller-Bridge, brother of Fleabag creator Phoebe Waller-Bridge and composer Isobel Waller-Bridge, in 2019. They announced their engagement in January 2022 and married on 22 September 2023. In September 2025, at the Downton Abbey: The Grand Finale premiere, Dockery revealed that she and Waller-Bridge are expecting their first child and in 2026 she gave birth.

== Arms ==
Coat of arms of the Waller-Bridges
Notes Royal Licence granted in May 1913 Crest 1st, on a wreath of the colours an eagle rising holding in the beak a sprig of laurel Proper (Bridge); 2. on a wreath of the colours, three mascles Or, in front of a walnut-tree Proper (Waller). Escutcheon Quarterly, 1st and 4th: Azure, issuant from the centre of a bar wavy of water Proper in the nombril point a bridge of three arches embattled Argent, masoned Sable, the whole between as many sea lions each crowned with a naval coronet Or (Bridge); 2nd and 3rd: Azure, between two bendlets Or, three walnut-leaves Argent, the whole between two fleur-de-lys of the Last (Waller). Motto Me juvat ire per altum

== Acting credits ==
Key
†	Denotes works that have not yet been released

=== Film ===
Year	Title	Role	Notes
2011	Hanna	False Marissa	
2012	Anna Karenina	Princess Myagkaya	
2014	Non-Stop	Nancy Hoffman	
2015	Self/less	Claire Hale	
2017	The Sense of an Ending	Susie Webster	
2019	Downton Abbey	Lady Mary Talbot	
2019	The Gentlemen	Rosalind "Roz" Pearson	
2022	Downton Abbey: A New Era	Lady Mary Talbot	
2023	Boy Kills World	Melanie van der Koy	
2024	Please Don't Feed the Children	Clara	
2024	Here	Mrs Harter	
2025	Flight Risk	Madolyn Harris	
2025	Downton Abbey: The Grand Finale	Lady Mary Talbot	
TBA	The Queen of Fashion †	Alexandra Shulman	Post-production

=== Television ===
Year	Title	Role	Notes
2005	Fingersmith	Betty	Miniseries
2006	Hogfather	Susan	Television film
2007	Dalziel and Pascoe	Aimee Hobbs	2 episodes
2008	Heartbeat	Sue Padgett	Episode: "Take Three Girls"
2008	Poppy Shakespeare	Dawn	Television film
2009	Red Riding: In the Year of Our Lord 1974	Kathryn Taylor	Television film
2009	Red Riding: In the Year of Our Lord 1983	Kathryn Taylor	Television film
2009	The Courageous Heart of Irena Sendler	Ewa Rozenfeld	Television film
2009	The Turn of the Screw	Ann	Television film
2009	Waking the Dead	Gemma Morrison	2 episodes
2009	Return to Cranford	Erminia Whyte	2 episodes
2010–2015	Downton Abbey	Lady Mary Crawley/Talbot	Main cast; 52 episodes
2012	Restless	Ruth Gilmartin	Miniseries
2012	American Dad!	Margaret Watkins (voice)	1 episode
2012	The Hollow Crown	Lady Kate Percy	Episode: "Henry IV, Part I and Part II"
2013	Family Guy	Lady Mary Crawley (voice)	Episode: "Boopa-dee Bappa-dee"
2015	Japan: Earth's Enchanted Islands	Narrator	BBC2 Documentary Series
2016–2017	Good Behavior	Letty Raines	Main cast; 20 episodes
2017	Angie Tribeca	Victoria Nova	1 episode
2017	Godless	Alice Fletcher	Miniseries; 7 episodes
2019	Tuca & Bertie	Lady Netherfield (voice)	Episode: "The Deli Guy"
2020	Defending Jacob	Laurie Barber	Miniseries; 8 episodes
2020–2022	Amphibia	Lady Olivia (voice)	9 episodes
2022	Anatomy of a Scandal	Kate Woodcroft	Miniseries; 6 episodes
2024	This Town	Estella	Main cast

=== Theatre ===
Year	Title	Role	Notes
2004	His Dark Materials	Jessie	National Theatre
2005	Henry IV, Parts I and II	Carrier	National Theatre
2005	The UN Inspector	Female activist	National Theatre
2005	Pillars of the Community	Dina	National Theatre
2007	Dying for It	Kleopatra	Almeida Theatre
2007	Pygmalion	Eliza Doolittle	UK tour
2008	Uncle Vanya	Yelena	UK tour
2008	Pygmalion	Eliza Doolittle	Old Vic Theatre
2009	Burnt by the Sun	Maroussia	National Theatre
2010	Hamlet	Ophelia	Crucible Theatre, Sheffield
2017–2018	Network	Diana Christensen	National Theatre, London
2026	Bloodsport: After Helen of Troy	Helen	Stratford East, London

== Awards and nominations ==
Year	Award	Category	Nominated work	Result
2005	Ian Charleson Awards	Best Actress	Pillars of Community	Nominated
2007	Ian Charleson Awards	Best Performance by an Actor – 2nd Prize	Pygmalion	Won
2008	Evening Standard Award	Outstanding Newcomer	Pygmalion	Nominated
2010	Laurence Olivier Award	Best Actress in a Supporting Role	Burnt by the Sun	Nominated
2011	Monte-Carlo Television Festival	Outstanding Actress Drama Series	Downton Abbey	Nominated
2012	Monte-Carlo Television Festival	Outstanding Actress Drama Series	Downton Abbey	Nominated
2012	Critics' Choice Television Award	Best Drama Actress	Downton Abbey	Nominated
2012	Glamour Awards	Editor's Special Award	—N/a	Won
2012	Primetime Emmy Awards	Outstanding Lead Actress in a Drama Series	Downton Abbey	Nominated
2012	Satellite Awards	Satellite Award for Best Actress – Television Series Drama	Downton Abbey	Nominated
2013	Golden Globe Award	Best Actress – Television Series Drama	Downton Abbey	Nominated
2013	Screen Actors Guild Award	Outstanding Performance by a Female Actor in a Drama Series	Downton Abbey	Nominated
2013	Screen Actors Guild Award	Outstanding Performance by an Ensemble in a Drama Series	Downton Abbey	Won
2013	Primetime Emmy Awards	Outstanding Lead Actress in a Drama Series	Downton Abbey	Nominated
2013	Huading Awards	Best Global Actress	Downton Abbey	Won
2013	Online Film and Television Association Awards	Best Actress in a Drama Series	Downton Abbey	Nominated
2014	Primetime Emmy Awards	Outstanding Lead Actress in a Drama Series	Downton Abbey	Nominated
2014	Screen Actors Guild Award	Outstanding Performance by an Ensemble in a Drama Series	Downton Abbey	Won
2015	Harper's Bazaar Women of the Year Awards	Television Icon Award	—N/a	Won
2015	Screen Actors Guild Award	Outstanding Performance by an Ensemble in a Drama Series	Downton Abbey	Won
2016	Screen Actors Guild Award	Outstanding Performance by an Ensemble in a Drama Series	Downton Abbey	Nominated
2016	Online Film and Television Association Awards	Best Actress in a Drama Series	Downton Abbey	Nominated
2017	Critics' Pick Awards	Best Actress in a Drama Series	Godless	Nominated
2018	Cannes International TV Series Film Festival	Variety Icon Award for Outstanding Achievement in Acting	—N/a	Won
2018	Primetime Emmy Awards	Outstanding Lead Actress in a Limited Series	Godless	Nominated
