= Debra Gillett =

British actress

- Occupation: Actress
- Spouse: Patrick Marber (m. 2002)
- Children: 3

Debra J. Gillett is an English actress who has appeared in productions including The Witches, Chimera, Truckers, Casualty, Just William, Dalziel and Pascoe, Spooks, Doctor Who, Soul Music, and Cranford.

== Career ==
Gillett's stage work includes Limehouse (2017). In 2018 she played The Nurse ("a cartoonish delight") in Patrick Marber's adaptation of Eugène Ionesco's Exit the King at the Royal National Theatre, and was a "sympathetic" Queen Charlotte in Adam Penford's adaptation of The Madness of George III at the Nottingham Playhouse.

She played Nurse Fay in a 1997 Radio 3 production of Loot by Orton, repeated in 2017.

== Personal life ==
Gillett married playwright Patrick Marber in 2002 and they have three children.

== Filmography ==
=== Film ===
Year	Title	Role	Notes
1990	The Witches	Waitress	
1991	Riff-Raff	Singer	
1991	Young Soul Rebels	Jill	
2000	Breathtaking	Julie	
2006	Notes on a Scandal	Lorraine	
2014	A Small Family Business	Poppy McCracken	
2016	Bridget Jones's Baby	Daisy	
2018	National Theatre Live: The Madness of George III	Queen Charlotte	

=== Television ===
Year	Title	Role	Notes
1991	Chimera	Julie	Episode #1.1
1991	G.B.H.	Sylvia	3 episodes
1991	Casualty	Reporter	Episode: "Judgement Day"
1991	Stay Lucky	Receptionist	Episode: "Poetic Justice"
1992	Truckers	Grimma	12 episodes
1992	Between the Lines	Mary Shibden	Episode: "Lies and Damned Lies"
1993	Screen Two	Pat McVurrich	Episode: "The Long Roads"
1995	The Bill	Nina	Episode: "Expert Witness"
1995	Eleven Men Against Eleven	Jenny	Television film
1995	Just William	Peggy	Episode: "William and the Old Man in the Fog"
1995	Coogan's Run	Maud	Episode: "The Curator"
1996	Wales Playhouse	Alison	Episode: "A Skip Day in Splott"
1997	Soul Music	Susan Sto Helit	7 episodes
1997	Mr. White Goes to Westminster	Kath	Television film
2001	Cold Feet	Georgina	Episode #4.2
2002	Dalziel and Pascoe	Sonia Wingate	2 episodes
2004–2005	Spooks	Debra Langham / Psychologist	3 episodes
2005	Footprints in the Snow	Val	Television film
2006	Doctor Who	Rita Connolly	Episode: "The Idiot's Lantern"
2007–2009	Cranford	Mrs Johnson	6 episodes
2011	The Many Faces of...	Mrs Johnson	Episode: "Dame Judi Dench"
2014	Call the Midwife	Mrs Harper	Episode #3.5
2021	Inside No. 9	Penny	Episode: "Last Night of the Proms"
