= New Social Alliance =

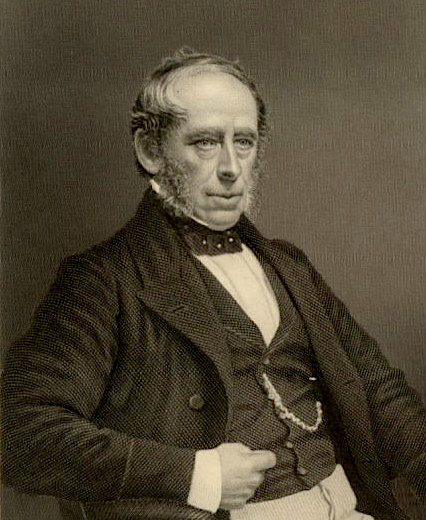
John Pakington publicly supported the New Social Alliance.

The New Social Alliance or New Social Movement was an idea supported by some British Conservatives in 1871 for an alliance between working-class leaders and aristocratic Conservatives to ameliorate the conditions of the working class. The historian John Vincent has called the New Social Alliance "conservative socialism" and a "poor man's Young England".

In July 1871 the Conservative MP John Pakington proposed to Lord Derby a committee or a commission of Conservative peers and landowners to consider the needs of the artisan class as articulated by their leaders. The idea originated with John Scott Russell, a Scottish engineer and ship builder. This would unite the landed class with the working class against the mercantile and manufacturing employers. Derby noted that "J. Manners takes it up warmly, Carnavon rather approves, Pakington is hot for it, and Disraeli sees in it a new method of outbidding the Whigs, or rather Gladstone". Some of the demands included: limiting the hours of work to eight hours a day; the right to take land compulsorily for working class housing; the sale of articles for consumption would be put on state account, suppressing the small tradesman; establishing technical schools; increased state provision for recreation and pleasure.

Derby opposed limiting working hours as this would involve, as he wrote in his diary,

...in principle something like an economical revolution, and that the whole scheme pointed in one direction – to the suppression of the capitalist, which would very soon be followed by that of the landowner and fundholder...In fact the plan, as he laid it before me, is that of the Socialists, as lately stated by themselves in a manifesto called Rights and Wrongs of Workmen, only with the part relating to the land left out.

In October Pakington gave a speech in which, according to Derby, he said "that the State was bound to provide the workingmen with lodging at fair rents and wholesome food at reasonable price". The newspapers saw this as "an attempt at coalition between Conservatives and Socialists, on the basis of 'Young England' ideas of twenty-five years ago". The Spectator claimed that Pakington gave a speech "inclining almost too strongly to that beneficent view of Government which but a few years ago political economy was never weary of denying" and claimed:

We can scarcely doubt that this address was really intended to strike the first note of an aristocratic and Tory movement on behalf of the working man,—which should outflank Mr. Gladstone's political justice by a liberal offer of social generosity.

The Spectator later wrote that the proposal was designed to carry out Disraeli's ideas as espoused in Coningsby and Sybil by "filling the chasm between "the two nations"".

At a speech at Blackheath on 28 October, the Liberal leader Gladstone warned his constituents against Pakington's scheme:

...they are not your friends, but they are your enemies in fact, though not in intention, who teach you to look to the Legislature for the radical removal of the evils that afflict human life.... It is the individual mind and conscience, it is the individual character, on which mainly human happiness or misery depends. (Cheers.) The social problems that confront us are many and formidable. Let the Government labour to its utmost, let the Legislature labour days and nights in your service; but, after the very best has been attained and achieved, the question whether the English father is to be the father of a happy family and the centre of a united home is a question which must depend mainly upon himself. (Cheers.) And those who...promise to the dwellers in towns that every one of them shall have a house and garden in free air, with ample space; those who tell you that there shall be markets for selling at wholesale prices retail quantities—I won't say are imposters, because I have no doubt they are sincere; but I will say they are quacks (cheers); they are deluded and beguiled by a spurious philanthropy, and when they ought to give you substantial, even if they are humble and modest boons, they are endeavouring, perhaps without their own consciousness, to delude you with fanaticism, and offering to you a fruit which, when you attempt to taste it, will prove to be but ashes in your mouths. (Cheers.)

The historian Richard Shannon has written that Disraeli took no more than "a politely benign general interest in the scheme" and it quickly faded from the political scene. However Shannon noted that "Disraeli's name and reputation became, and remain, indelibly identified with its central argument as the vital element of what was later mythologised into Disraelian Conservative and Tory Democracy".
