= Lothair (novel) =

1870 novel by Benjamin Disraeli

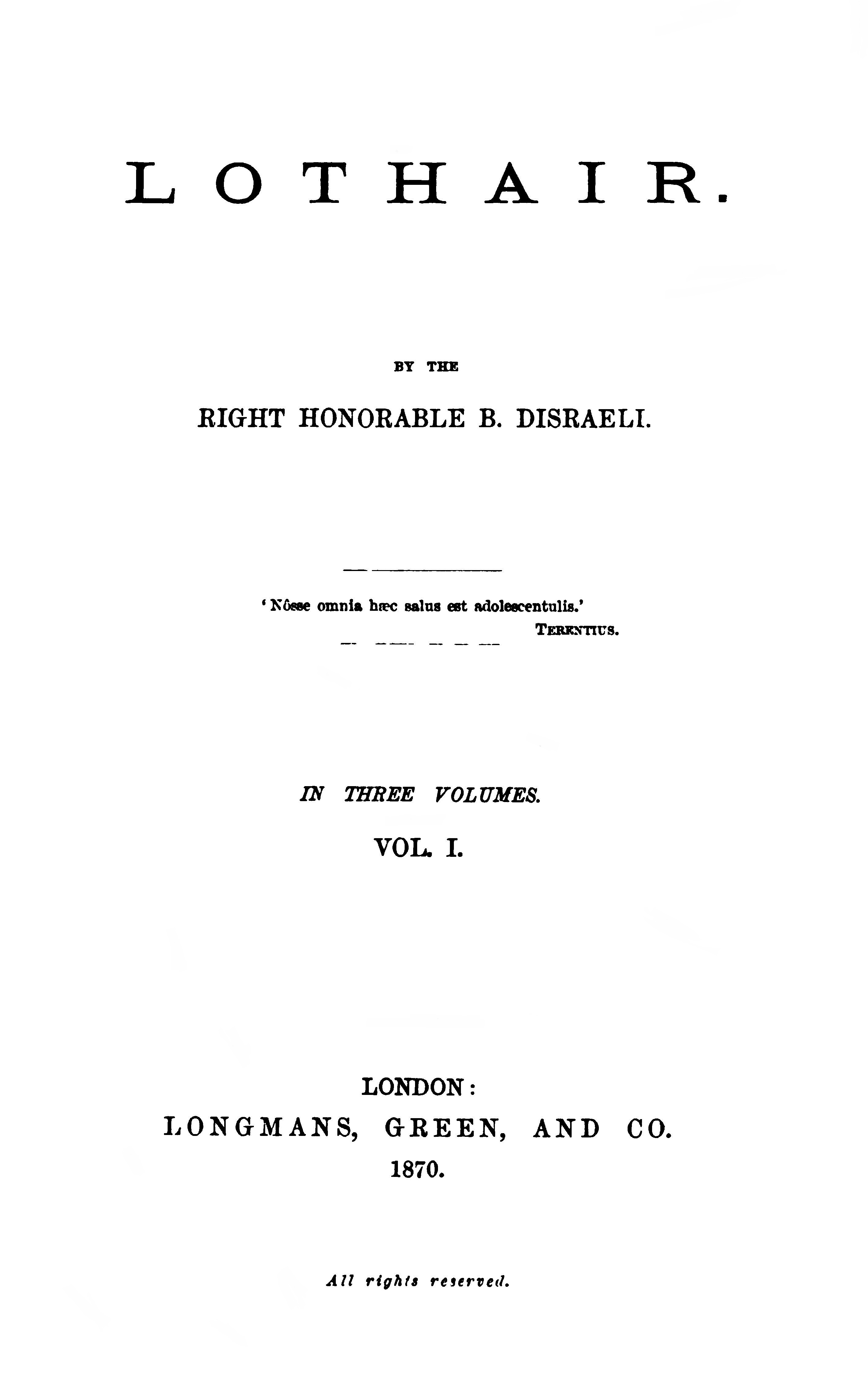
- First edition title page
- Author: Benjamin Disraeli
- Language: English
- Genre: Philosophical novel
- Publisher: Longmans, Green and Co.
- Publication date: 1870
- Publication place: United Kingdom
- Media type: Print (hardback)
- Pages: 982 pp

Lothair (1870) was a late novel by Benjamin Disraeli, the first he wrote after his first term as Prime Minister. It deals with the comparative merits of the Catholic and Anglican churches as heirs of Judaism, and with the topical question of Italian unification. Though Lothair was a hugely popular work among 19th century readers, it now to some extent lies in the shadow of the same author's Coningsby and Sybil. Lothair reflects anti-Catholicism of the sort that was popular in Britain, and which fueled support for Italian unification ("Risorgimento").

== Synopsis ==
Lothair, a wealthy young orphaned Scottish nobleman (loosely based on the 3rd Marquess of Bute) has been brought up in the legal guardianship of his Presbyterian uncle Lord Culloden and of a Catholic convert, Cardinal Grandison (based on Henry Edward Cardinal Manning). When he comes of age Lothair finds himself the centre of attention of three fascinating women, Lady Corisande, Clare Arundel, and Theodora Campion, representing the Church of England, the Roman Catholic Church, and the Radical cause respectively. Wavering in his allegiances, he unsuccessfully proposes marriage to Lady Corisande, almost joins the Catholic Church, and finally joins Theodora in Italy as a volunteer in the army of Garibaldi, which is fighting to take the Papal States for Italy. Theodora is killed at Viterbo, and Lothair is seriously wounded at the Battle of Mentana, but is nursed back to health by Clare Arundel, who tries to persuade him that he was saved by an apparition of the Virgin Mary. He takes refuge with the bohemian dandy Mr. Phoebus (a thinly disguised Frederic Leighton), who takes him to Syria, which, as the cradle of Christianity, seems the ideal place to reflect on the roots of the Christian faith. In Jerusalem he meets Paraclete, a mystic who teaches him that there is truth in many religions. Lothair returns to England and decides in favour of the Church of England, resisting the attempts of Cardinal Grandison and other prelates, including Mgr Catesby (modelled on Thomas Capel), to convert him to Catholicism. The novel ends with his marriage to Lady Corisande.

== Critical and popular reception ==
Lothair was first published by Longmans, Green and Co. on 2 May 1870, in 3 volumes. This first edition of 2000 copies sold out in two days, and no less than seven more British editions were needed before the end of the year. In the United States, where it was published by Appleton, 25,000 copies were sold in the first three days. Lothair-mania, as his publisher called it, was epidemic. A ship, a perfume, a galop, a waltz, a song and two racehorses were named after either Lothair himself or Lady Corisande. By 1876 Disraeli had earned £7500 from the novel, but it had not been so beneficial to his political career. Conservative politicians, it has been said, asked themselves awkward questions:

How could Parliamentarians be expected to trust an ex-Premier who, when half-way between sixty and seventy, instead of occupying his leisure, in accordance with the British convention, in classical, historical, or constitutional studies, produced a gaudy romance of the peerage, so written as to make it almost impossible to say how much was ironical or satirical, and how much soberly intended?…[It] revived all the former doubts as to whether a Jewish literary man, so dowered with imagination, and so unconventional in his outlook, was the proper person to lead a Conservative party to victory.

Lothair-mania was less noticeable among the critics, some of whom had political differences with the author. Among the most unkind was the notice in Macmillan's Magazine, which declared that "A single conscientious perusal (without skipping) of Lothair would be a creditable feat: few will voluntarily attempt a second." The Quarterly Review largely agreed, calling Disraeli's production:

A book which he calls a novel, but which is after all a political pamphlet, and a bid for the bigoted voices of Exeter Hall… It sins alike against good taste and justice…That there are happy thoughts and epigrammatic sentences sown broadcast in its pages need scarcely be said of a novel written by Mr. Disraeli. But as the true pearl lies embedded in the loose fibre of a mollusc, so Mr. Disraeli's gems of speech and thought are hidden in a vast maze of verbiage which can seldom be called English, and very frequently is downright nonsense…So far as feeling is concerned Lothair is as dull as ditch-water and as flat as a flounder.

The Conservative Pall Mall Gazette made the best of Disraeli's stylistic carelessness by speculating that Lothair "Must have cost the author, we cannot help fancying, no effort whatever; it was as easy and delightful for him to write as for us to read."

After Disraeli's death the praise came more plentifully. Edmund Gosse took the view that Disraeli had been writing with tongue in cheek, calling it "Unquestionably the greatest of his literary works – the superb ironic romance of Lothair"; the historian J. A. Froude thought it "A work immeasurably superior to anything of the kind which he had hitherto produced", because more purely a work of art than the politically engaged Coningsby and Sybil; and the Liberal politician George W. E. Russell judged it Disraeli's masterpiece, as being "A profound study of spiritual and political forces at a supremely important moment in the history of modern Europe". Sir Leslie Stephen dissented, believing it "A practical joke on a large scale, or a prolonged burlesque upon Disraeli's own youthful performances"; but as late as 1920 Disraeli's biographer George Earle Buckle could still claim that Coningsby and Lothair were the two novels on which his reputation rested with the general reader.

British editions succeeded each other at short intervals up to the 1920s, but for the last 80 years Lothair has been reprinted less often than Sybil or Coningsby. A recent critic has noted that "It is largely unread today except by dedicated literary biographers." Oxford University Press included it in their Oxford English Novels series in 1975, in an edition by Vernon Bogdanor.

== Derivative works ==
Bret Harte published a full-length parody called Lothaw: or, The Adventures of a Young Gentleman in Search of a Religion.

Lothair's Children, a novel purporting to be a sequel, was published in 1890 by an author under the pen name of "H.R.H." and was panned by critics at the time as "absurd" and "fantastical".
