= Chivalry =

Traditional ideology and code of conduct of knights

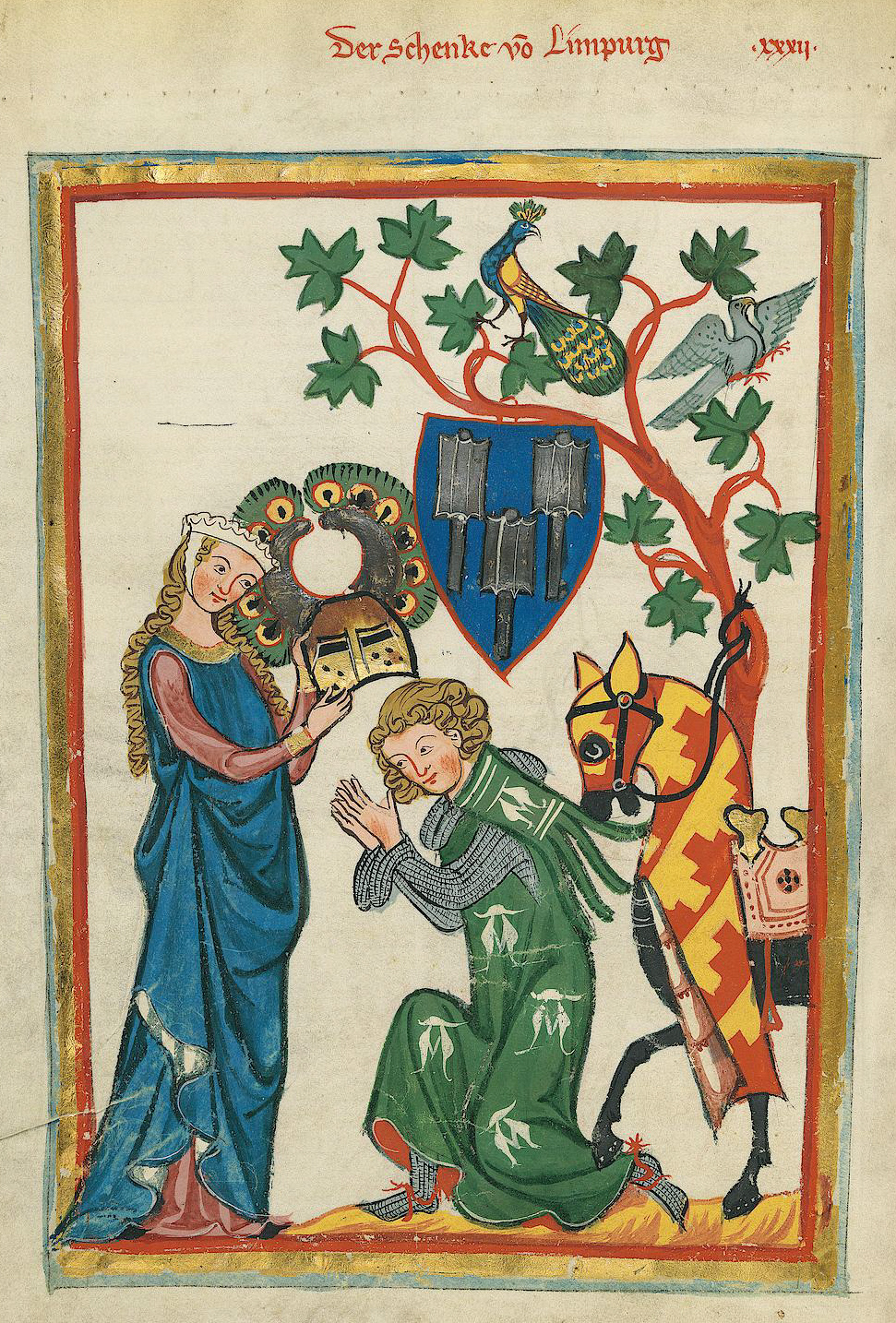
Konrad von Limpurg as a knight being armed by his lady in the Codex Manesse (early 14th century)

Chivalry, or the chivalric language, is an informal and varying code of conduct that developed in France between 1170 and 1220. It is associated with the medieval Christian institution of knighthood, with knights being members of various chivalric orders, and with knights' and gentlemen's behaviours which were governed by chivalrous social codes. The ideals of chivalry were popularized in medieval literature, particularly the literary cycles known as the Matter of France, relating to the legendary companions of Charlemagne and his men-at-arms, the paladins, and the Matter of Britain, informed by Geoffrey of Monmouth's Historia Regum Britanniae, written in the 1130s, which popularized the legend of King Arthur and his knights of the Round Table.

The code of chivalry that developed in medieval Europe had its roots in earlier centuries. It arose in the Carolingian Empire from the idealisation of the cavalryman—involving military bravery, individual training, and service to others—especially in Francia, among horse soldiers in Charlemagne's cavalry. Over time, the meaning of chivalry in Europe has been refined to emphasize more general social and moral virtues. The code of chivalry, as it stood by the Late Middle Ages, was a moral system which combined a warrior ethos, knightly piety, and courtly manners, all combining to establish a notion of honour and nobility. (Note: Johan Huizinga remarks in his book The Waning of the Middle Ages, "the source of the chivalrous idea, is pride aspiring to beauty, and formalised pride gives rise to a conception of honour, which is the pole of noble life".)

== Terminology and definitions ==
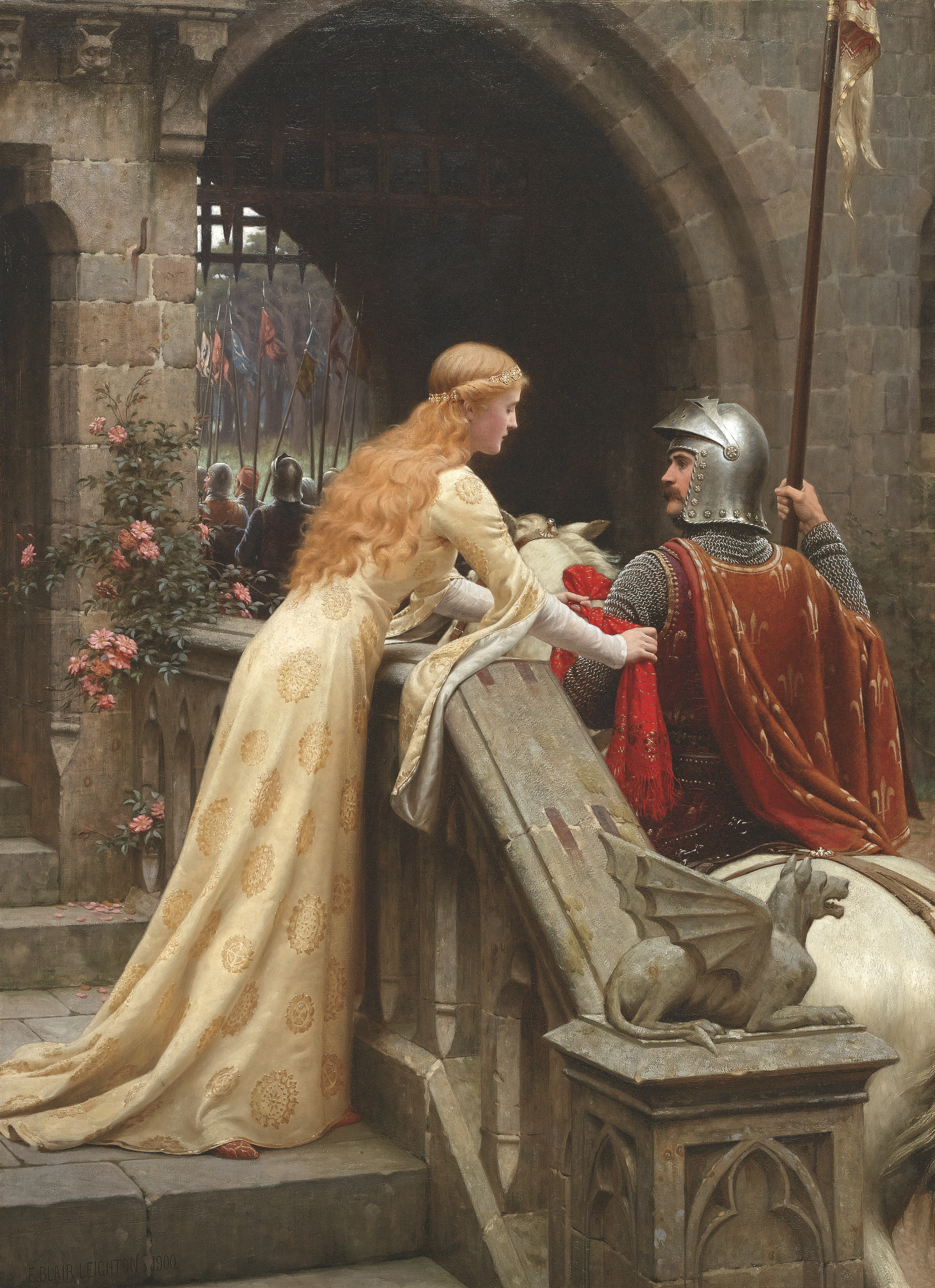
God Speed by English artist Edmund Leighton, 1900: depicting an armoured knight departing for war and leaving his beloved

The term "chivalry" derives from the Old French term chevalerie, which can be translated as "horse soldiery". (Note: The term for "horseman" (chevalier, from Late Latin caballarius) doubling as a term for the upper social classes parallels the long-standing usage of Classical Antiquity, see equites, hippeus.) Originally, the term referred only to horse-mounted men, from the French word for horse, cheval, but later it became associated with knightly ideals. The French word chevalier originally meant "a man of aristocratic standing, and probably of noble ancestry, who is capable, if called upon, of equipping himself with a war horse and the arms of heavy cavalryman and who has been through certain rituals that make him what he is." Therefore, during the Middle Ages, the collective term chevalerie (transformed in English into the word "chivalry") originally denoted the body of heavy cavalry upon formation in the field. In English, the term appears from 1292 (note that cavalry is from the Italian form of the same word). (Note: loaned via Middle French into English around 1540.)

The meaning of the term evolved over time into a broader sense, because in the Middle Ages the meaning of chevalier changed from the original concrete military meaning "status or fee associated with a military follower owning a war horse" or "a group of mounted knights" to the ideal of the Christian warrior ethos propagated in the romance genre, which was becoming popular during the 12th century, and the ideal of courtly love propagated in the contemporary Minnesang and related genres.

The ideas of chivalry are summarized in three medieval works: the anonymous poem Ordene de chevalerie, which tells the story of how Hugh II of Tiberias was captured and released upon his agreement to show Saladin (1138–1193) the ritual of Christian knighthood; the Libre del ordre de cavayleria, written by Ramon Llull (1232–1315), from Mallorca, whose subject is knighthood; and the Livre de Chevalerie of Geoffroi de Charny (1300–1356), which examines the qualities of knighthood, emphasizing prowess. None of the authors of these three texts knew the other two texts, and the three combine to depict a general concept of chivalry which is not precisely in harmony with any of them. To different degrees and with different details, they speak of chivalry as a way of life in which the military, the nobility, and religion combine.

The "code of chivalry" is thus a product of the Late Middle Ages, evolving after the end of the crusades partly from an idealization of the historical knights fighting in the Holy Land and from ideals of courtly love.

=== Ten Commandments of Chivalry ===
Pioneering French literary historian Léon Gautier compiled what he called the medieval Ten Commandments of chivalry in his book La Chevalerie (1884):

1. Thou shalt believe all that the Church teaches and thou shalt observe all its directions.
2. Thou shalt defend the Church.
3. Thou shalt respect all weaknesses, and shalt constitute thyself the defender of them.
4. Thou shalt love the country in which thou wast born.
5. Thou shalt not recoil before thine enemy.
6. Thou shalt make war against the infidel without cessation and without mercy.
7. Thou shalt perform scrupulously thy feudal duties, if they be not contrary to the laws of God.
8. Thou shalt never lie, and shalt remain faithful to thy pledged word.
9. Thou shalt be generous, and give largesse to everyone.
10. Thou shalt be everywhere and always the champion of the Right and the Good against Injustice and Evil.

In fact, there is no such medieval list. Gautier's effort was a series of moral bullet points he abstracted from his broad reading of 12th and 13th century romances.

== Literary chivalry and historical reality ==
Supporters of chivalry have assumed since the late medieval period that there was a time in the past when chivalry was a living institution, when men acted chivalrously, the imitation of which period would much improve the present.

However, with the birth of modern historical and literary research, scholars have found that however far back in time "The Age of Chivalry" is searched for, it is always further in the past, even back to the Roman Empire. From Jean Charles Léonard de Sismondi:

We must not confound chivalry with the feudal system. The feudal system may be called the real life of the period of which we are treating, possessing its advantages and inconveniences, its virtues and its vices. Chivalry, on the contrary, is the ideal world, such as it existed in the imaginations of the romance writers. Its essential character is devotion to woman and to honour.

Sismondi alludes to the fictitious Arthurian romances about the imaginary Court of King Arthur when taken as factual presentations of a historical age of chivalry. He continues:

The more closely we look into history, the more clearly shall we perceive that the system of chivalry is an invention almost entirely poetical. It is impossible to distinguish the countries in which it is said to have prevailed. It is always represented as distant from us both in time and place, and whilst the contemporary historians give us a clear, detailed, and complete account of the vices of the court and the great, of the ferocity or corruption of the nobles, and of the servility of the people, we are astonished to find the poets, after a long lapse of time, adorning the very same ages with the most splendid fictions of grace, virtue, and loyalty.... we are forced to confess that it is necessary to antedate the age of chivalry, at least three or four centuries before any period of authentic history.

== History ==
=== Europe before 1170: Courtliness and the noble habitus ===
Prior to codified chivalry, there was the uncodified code of noble conduct that focused on the preudomme, which can be translated as a wise, honest, and sensible man. This uncodified code—referred to as the noble habitus—is a term for the environment of behavioural and material expectations generated by all societies and classes. As a modern idea, it was pioneered by the French philosopher/sociologists Pierre Bourdieu and Maurice Merleau-Ponty, even though a precedent exists for the concept as far back as the works of Aristotle. Crouch in 2019 argued that the habitus on which "the superstructure of chivalry" was built and the preudomme was a part, were recognised by contemporaries as components of courtoisie (from Latin curialitas) which was defined as superior conduct appropriate to the aristocratic hall (court or curia). He saw it as being taught within the confines of the hall by its senior figures to youths confided to the lord and his household for their social upbringing. Crouch suggested courtliness had existed long before 1100 and preceded the codified medieval noble conduct we call chivalry, which he sees as beginning between 1170 and 1220.

The pre-chivalric noble habitus as discovered by Mills and Gautier and elaborated by Stephen Jaeger and David Crouch are as follows:

1. Loyalty: It is a practical utility in a warrior nobility. Richard Kaeuper associates loyalty with prowess. The importance of reputation for loyalty in noble conduct is demonstrated in William Marshal biography.
2. Forbearance: knights' self-control towards other warriors and at the courts of their lords was a part of the early noble habitus as shown in the Conventum of Hugh de Lusignan in the 1020s. The nobility of mercy and forbearance was well established by the second half of the 12th century long before there was any code of chivalry.
3. Hardiness: Historians and social anthropologists documented that in the early stages of 'proto-chivalry,' physical resilience and prowess in warfare were almost prerequisites for chivalry-associated knighthood. For warriors, regardless of origin, displaying exceptional physical prowess on the battlefield often led to attaining noble-knightly status or immediate nobilitation. To deliver a powerful blow in Arthurian literature almost always certifies the warrior's nobility. This view was supported by formal chivalric authorities and commentators: the anonymous author of La vraye noblesse states that a person of 'low degree' with martial bearing should be elevated to nobility by the prince or civic authority, "even though he be not rich or of noble lineage". Scholastic analyst Richard Kaeuper summarizes the matter: "A knight's nobility or worth is proved by his hearty strokes in battle". The virtue of hardiness, aligned with forbearance and loyalty, was a key military virtue of the preudomme. According to Philip de Navarra, a mature nobleman should possess hardiness as part of his moral virtues. Geoffrey de Charny also underscored the importance of hardiness as a masculine virtue tied to religious sentiments of contemptus mundi.
4. Largesse or Liberality: generosity was part of a noble quantity. According to Alan of Lille, largesse was not just a simple matter of giving away what he had, but "Largitas in a man caused him to set no store on greed or gifts, and to have nothing but contempt for bribes."
5. The Davidic ethic: encompasses the noble qualities of preudomme derived by clerics from Biblical tradition. This concept aligns with the classical Aristotelian notion of the "magnanimous personality" and the early Germanic and Norse tradition of the war-band leader as a heroic figure. The Christian-Davidic guardian-protector role of warrior-leadership emerged from the Frankish church to legitimize authority based on ethical commitment to safeguarding the vulnerable, ensuring justice for widows and orphans, and firmly opposing cruelty and injustice by those in power. This opposition extended to sub-princely magistrates and even monarchs who violated ethical principles of lex primordialis or lex naturae. At the heart of the Davidic ethic lies the idea of the strong demonstrating benevolence towards the weak.
6. Honour: honour was achieved by living up to the ideal of the preudomme and pursuing the qualities and behaviour listed above. Maurice Keen notes the most damning, irreversible mode of "demoting" one's honorific status, again humanly through contemporary eyes, consisted in displaying pusillanimous conduct on the battlefield. The loss of honour is a humiliation to a man's standing and is worse than death. Bertran de Born said: "For myself I prefer to hold a little piece of land in onor, than to hold a great empire with dishonor".

From the 12th century onward, chivalry came to be understood as a moral, religious, and social code of knightly conduct. The particulars of the code varied, but codes would emphasise the virtues of courage, honour, and service. Chivalry also came to refer to an idealisation of the life and manners of the knight at home in his castle and with his court. The code of chivalry, as it was known during the late medieval age, developed between 1170 and 1220.

=== The Crisis of Courtliness and Rise of Chivalry ===
Courtliness remained a recognised form of superior conduct in medieval European society throughout the middle ages. Courtly behaviour was expected of all aristocrats and its norms were integrated into chivalric literature. But as Crouch demonstrated courtliness (unlike chivalry) was not confined to noble society. There are examples of servants, merchants, clergy and free peasants being commended for their 'courtly' behaviour in medieval literature. His explanation for the appearance of chivalry as a recognisable and prescriptive code of behaviour is tied into the more exclusive definition of nobility that appears in the late 12th century. This had a particular impact on the professional horse warrior, the knight. Retained knights were a prominent feature of the households of barons, counts and princes, and were thought to be proper associates of their lords. As such knights adopted the fashions and behaviours of their lords. In many cases knights were often drawn from the younger sons of noble families so they would regard themselves as being noble too, if less noble than their lords. Crouch locates the tipping point of the nobilising of the knight as in the households of the sons of King Henry II of England, and in particular his eldest son, the Henry the Young King (died 1183). Young Henry lived a lavish lifestyle of unprecedented expense focussed on the great northern French tourneying society of the 1170s and 1180s. Since Young Henry had no domains to rule, his father was willing to fund the itinerant playboy lifestyle of his son to distract him from meddling in his realms, and also to stake a claim to the cultural high ground over the other European princes of the day. Young Henry was nonetheless heavily criticised for his wasteful and hedonistic life, and Crouch finds it significant that the first known work which used the knight as a moral exemplar and as a definitive nobleman, the De Re Militari of Ralph Niger (c. 1187) was written by the young man's former chaplain, in part as a moral defence of the knightly lifestyle.

Crouch suggests another reason why chivalry coalesced as a noble code in the late 12th century in his analysis of conduct literature. He suggests that the courtly habitus underwent a crisis as its moral failure became obvious to writers, particularly in the materialism that motivated courtly society. Crouch sees the Roman des Eles of the poet-knight Raoul de Houdenc, as a critique of courtliness and its failures. Raoul's solution is to focus moral eminence on the figure of the knight, who is to be the avatar of a new moral nobility, set above all other males. A knight was to eschew materialism (envie) and to embrace noble generosity (largesce).

=== Themes of chivalric literature ===
In medieval literature, chivalry can be classified into three overlapping areas:

1. Duties to countrymen and fellow Christians: this includes mercy, courage, valour, fairness, protection of the weak and the poor, and the servant-hood of the knight to his lord. This also includes being willing to give one's life for another's; whether for a poor man or his lord.
2. Duties to God: this includes being faithful to God, protecting the innocent, being faithful to the church, being the champion of good against evil, being generous, and obeying God above the feudal lord.
3. Duties to women: this is probably the most familiar aspect of chivalry. This includes what is often called courtly love—the idea that the knight is to serve a lady, and after her all other ladies—and a general gentleness and graciousness to all women.

Different weight given to different areas produced different strands of chivalry:

warrior chivalry
in which a knight's chief duty is to his lord, as exemplified by Sir Gawain in Sir Gawain and the Green Knight and The Wedding of Sir Gawain and Dame Ragnelle
religious chivalry
in which a knight's chief duty is to protect the innocent and serve God, as exemplified by Sir Galahad or Sir Percival in the Grail legends
courtly love chivalry
in which a knight's chief duty is to his own lady, and after her, all ladies, as exemplified by Sir Lancelot in his love for Queen Guinevere or Sir Tristan in his love for Iseult

=== Origins in military ethos ===
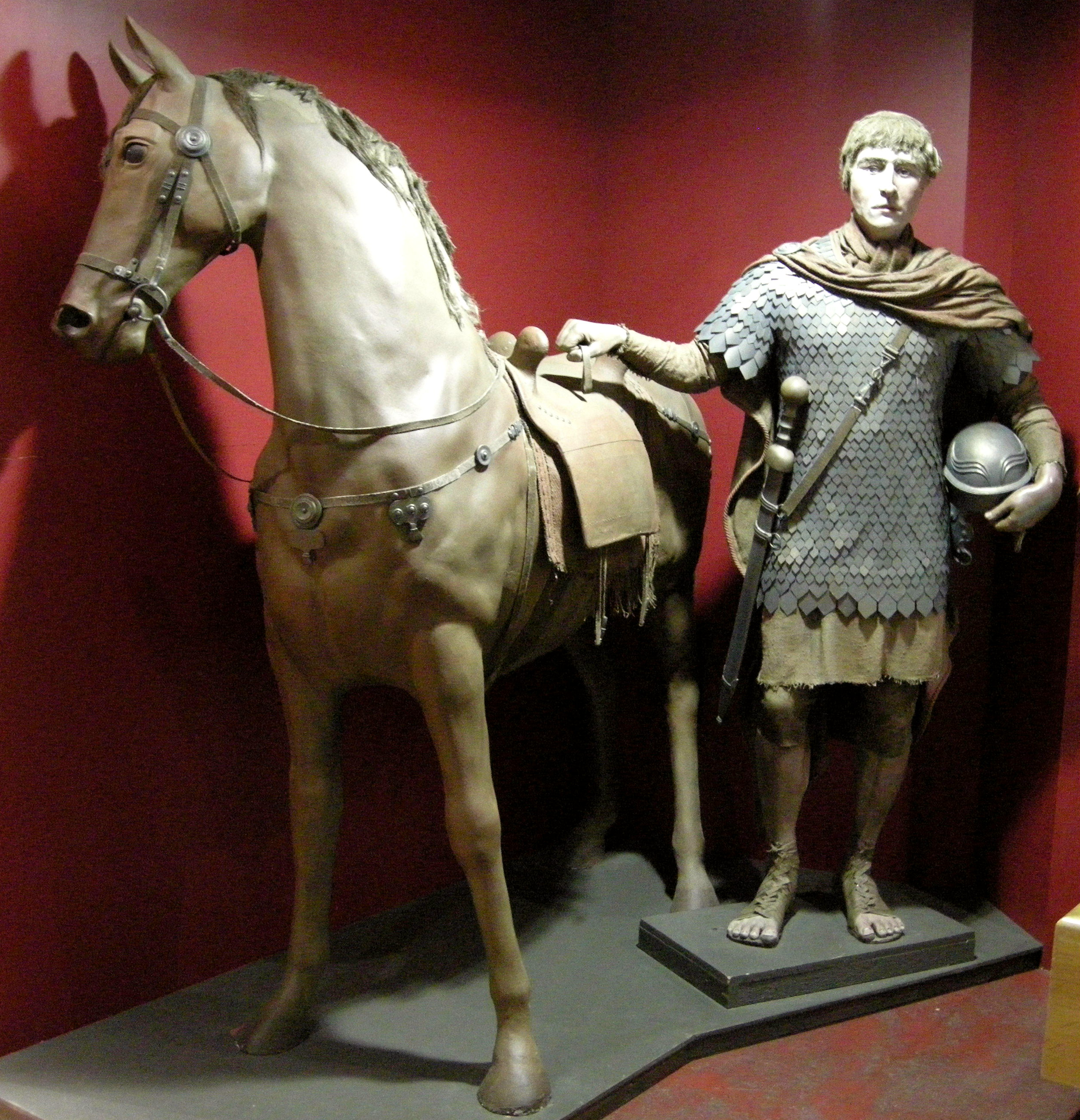
Reconstruction of a Roman cavalryman (eques)

Emerging with the knight's character and the chivalric ethos were novel elements: revised social status, innovative military tactics, and fresh literary themes. Chivalric codes encompassed regulations such as pledging loyalty to the overlord and upholding warfare rules. These rules dictated refraining from attacking a defenseless opponent and prioritizing the capture of fellow nobles for later ransom instead of immediate harm, akin to adhering to a perceived codified law. The chivalric ideals are based on those of the early medieval warrior class, and martial exercise and military virtue remain integral parts of chivalry until the end of the medieval period, as the reality on the battlefield changed with the development of Early Modern warfare, and increasingly restricted it to the tournament ground and duelling culture. The joust remained the primary example of knightly display of martial skill throughout the Renaissance (the last Elizabethan Accession Day tilt was held in 1602).

The martial skills of the knight carried over to the practice of the hunt, and hunting expertise became an important aspect of courtly life in the later medieval period (see terms of venery). Related to chivalry was the practice of heraldry and its elaborate rules of displaying coats of arms as it emerged in the High Middle Ages.

=== Chivalry and Christianity ===
Christianity had a modifying influence on the classical concept of heroism and virtue, nowadays identified with the virtues of chivalry. The Peace and Truce of God in the 10th century was one such example, which placed limits on knights to protect and honour the weaker members of society and also help the church maintain peace. At the same time the church became more tolerant of war in the defence of faith, espousing theories of the just war; and liturgies were introduced which blessed a knight's sword, and a bath of chivalric purification. In the Grail romances and Chevalier au Cygne, it was the ethos of the Christian knighthood that its way of life was to please God, and chivalry was an order of God. Chivalry as a Christian vocation combined Teutonic heroic values with the militant tradition of the Old Testament.

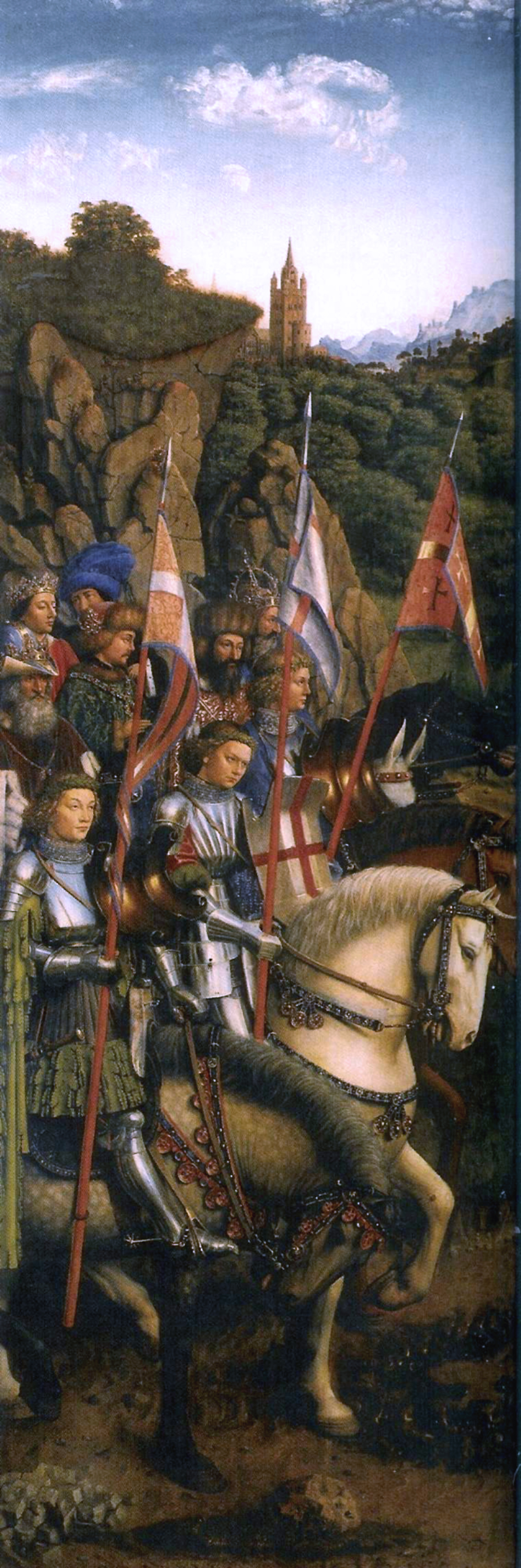
Knights of Christ by Jan van Eyck

The first noted support for chivalric vocation, or the establishment of a knightly class to ensure the sanctity and legitimacy of Christianity, was written in 930 by Odo, abbot of Cluny, in the Vita of St. Gerald of Aurillac, which argued that the sanctity of Christ and Christian doctrine can be demonstrated through the legitimate unsheathing of the "sword against the enemy". In the 11th century, the concept of a "knight of Christ" (miles Christi) gained currency in France, Spain, and Italy. These concepts of "religious chivalry" were further elaborated in the era of the Crusades, with the Crusades themselves often seen as a chivalrous enterprise. The military orders of the crusades which developed in this period came to be seen as the earliest flowering of chivalry, and some of their opponents like Saladin were likewise depicted as chivalrous adversaries. It remains unclear to what extent the notable military figures of this period—such as Saladin, Godfrey of Bouillon, William Marshal, or Bertrand du Guesclin—actually did set new standards of knightly behaviour, or to what extent they merely behaved according to existing models of conduct which came in retrospect to be interpreted along the lines of the "chivalry" ideal of the Late Middle Ages. Nevertheless, chivalry and crusades were not the same thing. While the crusading ideology had largely influenced the ethic of chivalry during its formative times, chivalry itself was related to a whole range of martial activities and aristocratic values which had no necessary linkage with crusading.

The Virgin Mary was venerated by multiple chivalric orders, including the Teutonic Knights, who honored her as their patroness. The medieval development of chivalry, with the concept of the honour of a lady and the ensuing knightly devotion to it, not only derived from the thinking about Mary, but also contributed to it. Although women were at times viewed as the source of evil, it was Mary who as mediator to God was a source of refuge for man. The development of medieval Mariology and the changing attitudes towards women paralleled each other.

=== Influence of the Moors and Romans ===
The works of Roman poets like Ovid and Cicero bore some similarities to the typical depiction of romance in chivalric literature during the Middle Ages. In Ovid's works, lovers "became sleepless, grew pale, and lost their appetite," while Cicero's works celebrated the "ennobling power of love". Some scholars also point to the romantic poetry of the Arabs as antecedents to the depiction of courtly love in medieval European literature. In the works of the Cordoban author Ibn Hazm, for example, "lovers develop passions for slave boys as well as girls, interchangeably, and the slave is recognized as now the master of his beloved." Ibn Hazm's The Ring of the Dove is a noteworthy depiction of a lover's extreme submissiveness.

Medieval courtly literature glorifies the valour, tactics, and ideals of both Moors and ancient Romans. For example, the ancient handbook of warfare written by Vegetius called De re militari was translated into French in the 13th century as L'Art de chevalerie by Jean de Meun. Later writers also drew from Vegetius, such as Honoré Bonet, who wrote the 14th century L'Arbes des batailles, which discussed the morals and laws of war. In the 15th century, Christine de Pizan combined themes from Vegetius, Bonet, and Frontinus in Livre des faits d'armes et de chevalerie.

=== Late Middle Ages ===
In the 14th century, Jean Froissart wrote his Chronicles which captured much of the Hundred Years' War, including the Battle of Crécy and later the Battle of Poitiers both of which saw the defeat of the French nobility by armies made up largely of common men using longbows. The chivalric tactic employed by the French armoured nobility, namely bravely charging the opposition in the face of a hail of arrows, failed repeatedly. Froissart noted the subsequent attacks by common English and Welsh archers upon the fallen French knights.

Chronicles also captured a series of uprisings by common people against the nobility, such as the Jacquerie and The Peasant's Revolt and the rise of the common man to leadership ranks within armies. Many of these men were promoted during the Hundred Years' War but were later left in France when the English nobles returned home, and became mercenaries in the Free Companies, for example John Hawkwood, the mercenary leader of White Company. The rise of effective, paid soldiery replaced noble soldiery during this period, leading to a new class of military leader without any adherence to the chivalric code.

Chivalry underwent a revival and elaboration of chivalric ceremonial and rules of etiquette in the 14th century that was examined by Johan Huizinga in The Waning of the Middle Ages, which dedicates a chapter to "The idea of chivalry". In contrasting the literary standards of chivalry with the actual warfare of the age, the historian finds the imitation of an ideal past illusory; in an aristocratic culture such as Burgundy and France at the close of the Middle Ages, "to be representative of true culture means to produce by conduct, by customs, by manners, by costume, by deportment, the illusion of a heroic being, full of dignity and honour, of wisdom, and, at all events, of courtesy.... The dream of past perfection ennobles life and its forms, fills them with beauty and fashions them anew as forms of art".

In the later Middle Ages, wealthy merchants strove to adopt chivalric attitudes. The sons of the bourgeoisie were educated at aristocratic courts, where they were trained in the manners of the knightly class. This was a democratisation of chivalry, leading to a new genre called the courtesy book, which were guides to the behaviour of "gentlemen". Thus, the post-medieval gentlemanly code of the value of a man's honour, respect for women, and a concern for those less fortunate, is directly derived from earlier ideals of chivalry and historical forces that created it.

Japan was the only country that banned the use of firearms completely to maintain ideals of chivalry and acceptable form of combat. In 1543, Japan established a government monopoly on firearms. The Japanese government destroyed firearms and enforced a preference for traditional Japanese weapons.

=== Criticism ===
Medieval historian Richard W. Kaeuper saw chivalry as a central focus in the study of the European Middle Ages that was too often presented as a civilizing and stabilizing influence in the turbulent Middle Ages. On the contrary, Kaueper argues "that in the problem of public order the knights themselves played an ambivalent, problematic role and that the guides to their conduct that chivalry provided were in themselves complex and problematic." Many of the codes and ideals of chivalry were contradictory: when knights did live up to them, they did not lead to a more "ordered and peaceful society". The tripartite conception of medieval European society (those who pray, those who fight, and those who work) along with other linked subcategories of monarchy and aristocracy, worked in congruence with knighthood to reform the institution in an effort "to secure public order in a society just coming into its mature formation."

Kaeuper says that knighthood and the worldview of "those who fight" was pre-Christian in many ways and outside the purview of the church, at least initially. The church saw it as a duty to reform and guide knights in a way that weathered the disorderly, martial, and chauvinistic elements of chivalry. Royalty also clashed with knighthood over the conduct of warfare and personal disputes between knights and other knights (and even between knights and aristocracy). While the worldview of "those who work" (the burgeoning merchant class and bourgeoisie) was still in incubation, Kaeuper states that the social and economic class that would end up defining modernity was fundamentally at odds with knights, and those with chivalrous valor saw the values of commerce as beneath them. Those who engaged in commerce and derived their value system from it could be confronted with violence by knights.

According to British historian David Crouch, many early writers on medieval chivalry cannot be trusted as accurate sources, because they sometimes have "polemical purpose which colours their prose". As for Kenelm Henry Digby and Léon Gautier, chivalry was a means to transform their corrupt and secular worlds. Gautier also emphasized that chivalry originated from the Teutonic forests and was brought up into civilization by the Catholic Church. Charles Mills used chivalry "to demonstrate that the Regency gentleman was the ethical heir of a great moral estate, and to provide an inventory of its treasure". Mills also stated that chivalry was a social, not a military phenomenon, with its key features: generosity, fidelity, liberality, and courtesy.

== Modern times ==
=== End of chivalry ===
Chivalry was dynamic; it adjusted in response to local situations, and this probably led to its demise. There were many chivalric groups in England as imagined by Sir Thomas Malory when he wrote Le Morte d'Arthur in the late 15th century; perhaps each group created its own chivalric ideology. Malory's perspective reflects the condition of 15th-century chivalry. When Le Morte d'Arthur was printed, William Caxton urged knights to read the romance with an expectation that reading about chivalry could unite a community of knights already divided by the Wars of the Roses.

During the early Tudor rule in England, some knights still fought according to that ethos. Fewer knights were engaged in active warfare because battlefields during this century were generally the arena of professional infantrymen, with less opportunity for knights to show chivalry. It was the beginning of the demise of the knight. The rank of knight never faded, but Queen Elizabeth I ended the tradition that any knight could create another, making this exclusively the preserve of the monarch. Christopher Wilkins contends that Sir Edward Woodville, who rode from battle to battle across Europe and died in 1488 in Brittany, was the last knight errant who witnessed the fall of the Age of Chivalry and the rise of modern European warfare. By the time the Middle Ages came to an end, the code of chivalry was gone.

=== Modern manifestations and revivals ===
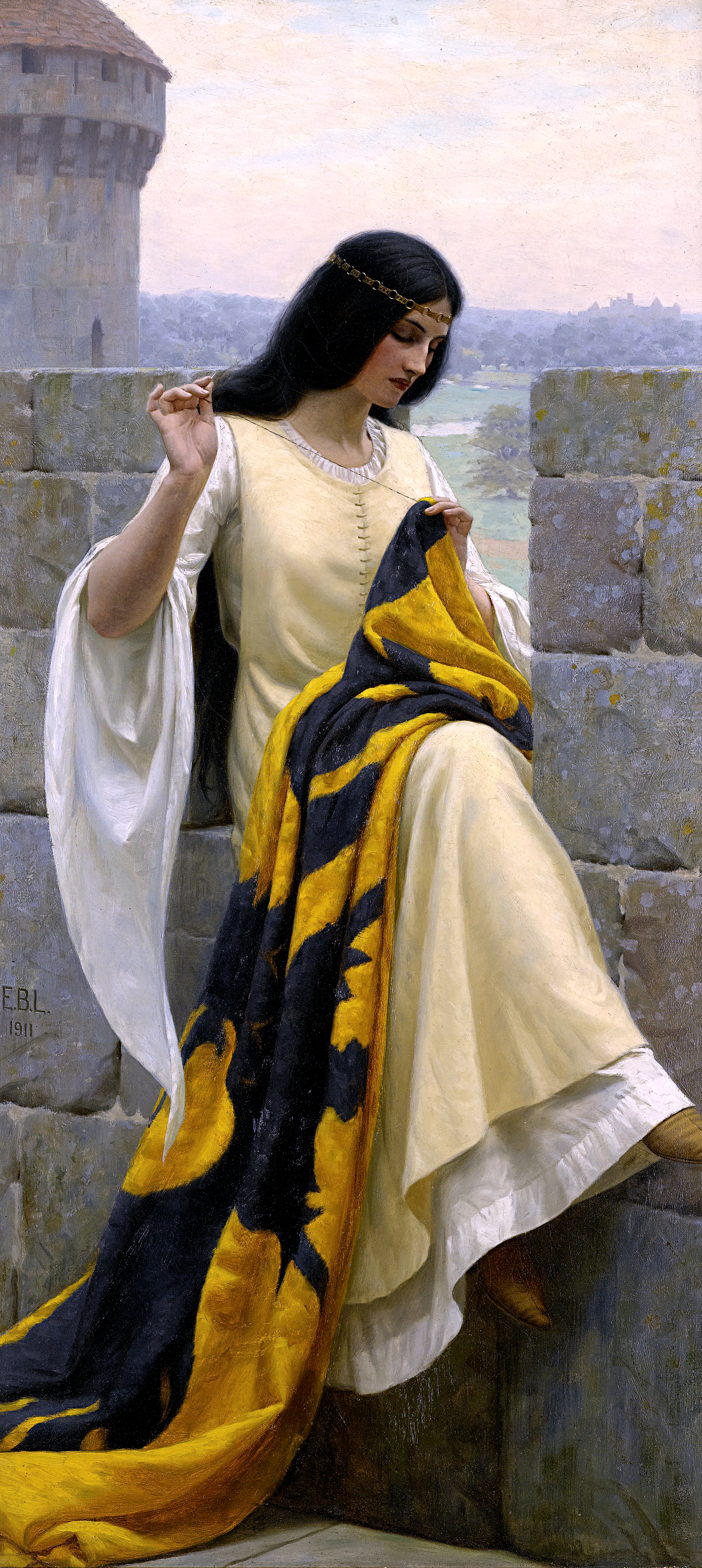
Depiction of chivalric ideals in Romanticism (Stitching the Standard by Edmund Blair Leighton: the lady prepares for a knight to go to war)

Chivalry!—why, maiden, she is the nurse of pure and high affection—the stay of the oppressed, the redresser of grievances, the curb of the power of the tyrant—Nobility were but an empty name without her, and liberty finds the best protection in her lance and her sword.

—Walter Scott, Ivanhoe (1820)

The chivalric ideal persisted into the early modern and modern period. The custom of founding chivalric orders by Europe's monarchs and high nobility peaked in the late medieval period, but it persisted during the Renaissance and well into the Baroque and early modern period, with e.g. the Tuscan Order of Saint Stephen (1561), the French Order of Saint Louis (1693) or the Anglo-Irish Order of St. Patrick (1783), and numerous dynastic orders of knighthood remain active in countries that retain a tradition of monarchy.

At the same time, with the change of courtly ideas during the Baroque period, the ideals of chivalry began to be seen as dated, or "medieval". Don Quixote, published in 1605–15, burlesqued the medieval chivalric novel or romance by ridiculing the stubborn adherence to the chivalric code in the face of the modern world as anachronistic, giving rise to the term Quixotism. Conversely, elements of Romanticism sought to revive such "medieval" ideals or aesthetics in the late 18th and early 19th century.

The behavioural code of military officers down to the Napoleonic era, the American Civil War (especially as idealised in the "Lost Cause" mythology), and to some extent even to World War I, was still strongly modelled on the historical ideals, resulting in a pronounced duelling culture, which in some parts of Europe also held sway over the civilian life of the upper classes. With the decline of the Ottoman Empire, however, the military threat from the "infidel" disappeared. The European wars of religion spanned much of the early modern period and consisted of infighting between factions of various Christian denominations. This process of confessionalization ultimately gave rise to a new military ethos based on nationalism rather than "defending the faith against the infidel".

Social commentators of the Victorian era advocated for a revival of chivalry in order to remedy the ill effects of the Industrial Revolution. Thomas Carlyle's "Captains of Industry" were to lead a "Chivalry of Labour", a beneficent form of governance that is hierarchical yet fraternal in nature, rather than materialistic. John Ruskin's "Ideal Commonwealth" took chivalry as one of its basic characteristics.

From the early modern period, the term gallantry (from galant, the Baroque ideal of refined elegance) rather than chivalry became used for the proper behaviour of upper-class men towards upper-class women. In the 19th century, there were attempts to revive chivalry for the purposes of the gentleman of that time. Kenelm Henry Digby wrote his The Broad-Stone of Honour for this purpose, offering the definition: "Chivalry is only a name for that general spirit or state of mind which disposes men to heroic actions, and keeps them conversant with all that is beautiful and sublime in the intellectual and moral world."

The pronouncedly masculine virtues of chivalry came under attack on the parts of the masculist and upper-class suffragettes campaigning for gender equality in the early 20th century, (Note: "The idea that men were to act and live deferentially on behalf of women and children, though an ancient principle, was already under attack by 1911 from militant suffragettes intent on leveling the political playing field by removing from the public mindset the notion that women were a 'weaker sex' in need of saving.") and with the decline of the military ideals of duelling culture and of European aristocracies in general following the catastrophe of World War I, the ideals of chivalry became widely seen as outmoded by the mid-20th century. As a material reflection of this process, the dress sword lost its position as an indispensable part of a gentleman's wardrobe, a development described as an "archaeological terminus" by Ewart Oakeshott, as it concluded the long period during which the sword had been a visible attribute of the free man, beginning as early as three millennia ago with the Bronze Age sword.

During the 20th century, the chivalrous ideal of protecting women came to be seen as a trope of melodrama ("damsel in distress"). The term chivalry retains a certain currency in sociology, in reference to the general tendency of men, and of society in general, to lend more attention offering protection from harm to women than to men, or in noting gender gaps in life expectancy, health, etc., also expressed in media bias giving significantly more attention to female than to male victims. (Note: For example, criminologist Richard Felson writes "An attack on a woman is a more serious transgression than an attack on a man because it violates a special norm protecting women from harm. This norm—chivalry—discourages would-be attackers and encourages third parties to protect women.")

According to William Manchester, General Douglas MacArthur was a chivalric warrior who fought a war with the intention to conquer the enemy, eliminating their ability to strike back, then treated them with the understanding and kindness due their honour and courage. One prominent model of his chivalrous conduct was in World War II and his treatment of the Japanese at the end of the war. On May 12, 1962, MacArthur gave a famous speech in front of the cadets of United States Military Academy at West Point by referring to a great moral code, the code of conduct and chivalry, when emphasizing duty, honour, and country.

== Criticism of chivalry ==
Miguel de Cervantes, in Part I of Don Quixote (1605), attacks chivalric literature as historically inaccurate and therefore harmful, though he was in agreement with many so-called chivalric principles and guides to behavior. He toyed with but never intended to write a chivalric romance that was historically truthful.

Peter Wright criticizes the tendency to produce singular descriptions of chivalry, claiming there are many variations or "chivalries". Among the different chivalries, Wright includes "military chivalry" complete with its code of conduct and proper contexts, and woman-directed "romantic chivalry" complete with its code of conduct and proper contexts, among others.

Chivalry has been described as sexist. Chivalry was also criticized in terms of men's rights. Ernest Bax described chivalry as "the deprivation, the robbery from men of the most elementary personal rights in order to endow women with privileges at the expense of men" in The fraud of feminism (1913), and criticized the Ladies First that took place in the Titanic sinking.

== See also ==
- The Book of the Courtier
- Domnei
- Eight Beatitudes
- Habitus (sociology)
- High Court of Chivalry
- Honor
- Knight-errant
- Nine Noble Virtues
- Nine Worthies
- Noblesse oblige
- Pas d'Armes
- Seven virtues
- Spanish chivalry
- Virtue
- Warrior code
- Women and children first

=== Cross-cultural comparisons ===
- Ayyaran
- Futuwwa
- Bushido
- Youxia
- Sesok-ogye
- Emi Omo Eso
- Eso Ikoyi
- Furusiyya
- Junzi
- Maharlika
- Pashtunwali
- Samurai
- Timawa
