= The Broad-Stone of Honour =

Book by Kenelm Henry Digby

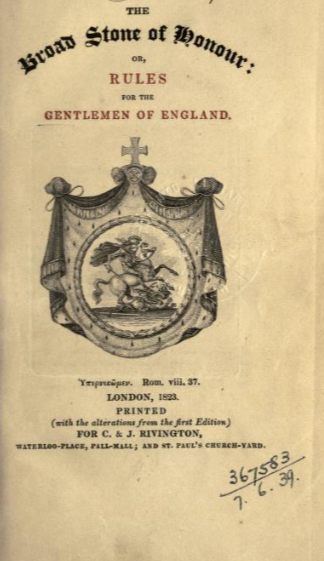
- Title page for The Broad Stone of Honour, or Rules for the Gentlemen of England (1823)
- Author: Kenelm Henry Digby
- Language: English
- Genre: Non-fiction
- Publisher: F. C. & J. Rivington
- Publication date: 1822
- Publication place: United Kingdom

The Broad Stone of Honour, or Rules for the Gentlemen of England, is a book written by Kenelm Henry Digby and published first in 1822 by F. C. & J. Rivington of London. Then the work was subdivided into its constituent parts and published as Godefridus (1829), Tancredus (1828), Morus (1826) and Orlandus (1829). Later it was revised and republished as The Broad Stone of Honour: Or, the True Sense and Practice of Chivalry (1844 to 1948).

Now almost unknown, Digby's The Broad Stone of Honour (named after his favourite castle, Ehrenbreitstein) was an attempt to describe the true meaning of chivalry and to revive it in modern life. In his Godefridus section, Digby defined chivalry:

Chivalry is only a name for that general spirit or state of mind which disposes men to heroic actions, and keeps them conversant with all that is beautiful and sublime in the intellectual and moral world.

The Broad-Stone is plentifully supplied with examples from medieval literature, even the most obscure accounts. Even his admirers often found his appreciation of the Middle Ages excessive, in that he refused to see any fault in them. Still, the work was deeply influential. Its attack on utilitarianism and its devotion to rationalism over the heart, his lack of interest in intellectual ability, and his disdain for making money all had serious impact on the Victorian notion of a proper gentleman. It has been called "the breviary of Young England."

Digby concluded that the whole concept of gallantry or chivalry is to be found in the Eight Beatitudes; significantly the eight-pointed crosses used by the Knights of Malta and other such orders are believed to have alluded to the same idea. The book was so influential in its day that ideas such as the Boy Scout movement can be traced back to it.

== Footnotes ==
- Holland, Bernard - Memoir of Kenelm Digby first published 1919; paperback, Fisher Press, 1992 ISBN 1-874037-05-1
