= Roman à thèse =

A roman à thèse (French; German: tendenzroman, lit. 'thesis novel') is a novel which is didactic or which expounds a theory.

In a book on the genre and French examples thereof, Authoritarian Fictions: the Ideological Novel as a Literary Genre, literary scholar Susan Suleiman proposed the definition "a novel written in the realistic mode [...] which signals to the reader as primarily didactic in intent, seeking to demonstrate the validity of a political, philosophical, or religious doctrine."

== List of romans à thèse ==
- Candide by Voltaire
- Sybil by Benjamin Disraeli
- Crime and Punishment by Fyodor Dostoyevsky
- The Plague by Albert Camus
- The Stranger by Albert Camus
- Atlas Shrugged by Ayn Rand
- Runaway Horses by Yukio Mishima

== See also ==
- Bildungsroman
- Philosophical fiction
- Roman-fleuve
