= Tancred (novel) =

1847 novel by Benjamin Disraeli

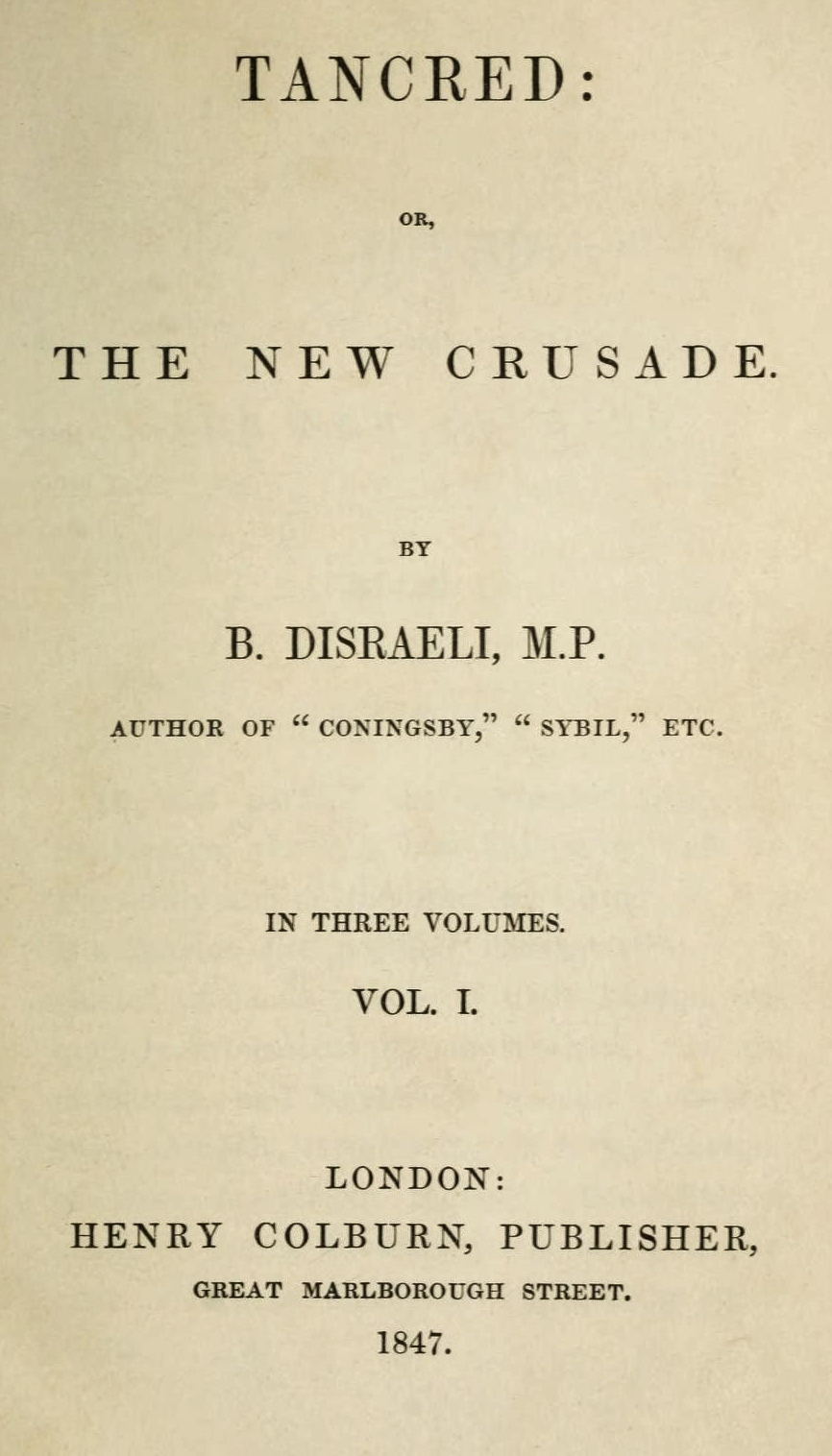
First edition title page

Tancred; or, The New Crusade (1847) is a novel by Benjamin Disraeli, first published by Henry Colburn in three volumes. Together with Coningsby (1844) and Sybil (1845) it forms a sequence sometimes called the Young England trilogy. It shares a number of characters with the earlier novels, but unlike them is concerned less with the political and social condition of England than with a religious and even mystical theme: the question of how Judaism and Christianity are to be reconciled, and the Church reborn as a progressive force. The character Eva discusses the state of Europe: "Europe is too proud, with its new command over nature, to listen even to prophets. Levelling mountains, riding without horses, sailing without winds, how can these men believe that there is any power, human or divine, superior to themselves?" Tancred continues: "Europe is not happy. Amid the false excitement, the bustling invention, and the endless toil, a profound melancholy broods over its spirit and gnaws at its heart. In vain they baptise their tumult by the name of progress; the whisper of a demon is ever asking them, "Progress, from whence and to what?" Excepting those who still cling to your Arabian creeds, Europe, that quarter of the globe to which God has never spoken, Europe is without consolation."

== Synopsis ==
Tancred, Lord Montacute, the novel's idealistic young hero, seems destined to live the life of a conventional member of the British ruling class. Dissatisfied with his life in fashionable London circles, he instead leaves his parents and retraces the steps of his Crusader ancestors to the Holy Land, hoping there to "penetrate the great Asian mystery" and understand the roots of Christianity. He meets the beautiful Eva, daughter of a Jewish financier, and becomes involved in the political machinations of her foster-brother, the brilliant Fakredeen, a Lebanese emir. At Fakredeen's instigation Tancred is kidnapped and held captive, but is nevertheless allowed to visit Mount Sinai. He then has a vision of an angel who tells him he must be the prophet of "the sublime and solacing doctrine of theocratic equality", a concept which Disraeli leaves somewhat hazy. Tancred falls ill, and is released at the instigation of Eva, who nurses him back to health. She teaches him about the glories of Mediterranean civilization and the debt that Christianity owes to Judaism. Tancred, in love with Eva and utterly convinced that she is right, proposes marriage, but the romance is broken off when his parents appear to reclaim their son and take him back to England.

== Reception ==
Critics noted that the novel's character, Fakredeen revealingly explores Disraeli's real self. They ask if it was coincidental that Tancred's obsession with the East and his crusade to create a new empire foreshadows the imperialism of Disraeli towards India and the Ottoman Empire in the 1870s.
