= Young England =

Former political Group

- Leader: Benjamin Disraeli
- Founded: 1842
- Dissolved: 1846
- Ideology: Absolute monarchism Feudalism; Paternalistic conservatism Right-wing socialism Social Toryism
- Political position: Right-wing
- Religion: Church of England

Young England was a Victorian-era political group with a political message based on an idealised feudalism: an absolute monarch and a strong Established Church, with the philanthropy of noblesse oblige as the basis for its paternalistic form of social organisation. For the most part, its unofficial membership was confined to a splinter group of Tory aristocrats who had attended Eton and Cambridge together, among them George Smythe, Lord John Manners, Henry Thomas Hope and Alexander Baillie-Cochrane. The group's leader and figurehead was Benjamin Disraeli, who bore the distinction of having neither an aristocratic background nor a public school or university education. Young England promulgated a conservative and romantic species of social Toryism.

Richard Monckton Milnes is credited with coining the name Young England, a name which suggested a relationship between Young England and the mid-century groups Young Ireland, Young Italy, Young Germany, and Young Europe. However, these political organisations, while nationalistic like Young England, commanded considerable popular support and (following lead Young Italy organiser Giuseppe Mazzini) were socially liberal and politically egalitarian and broadly republican.

== Expansion ==
Through countryside speeches and pamphlet distribution, Young England attempted sporadically to proselytise to the lower classes. However, the few tracts, the poetry, and the novels that embodied the social vision of Young England were directed to a "New Generation" of educated, religious, and socially conscious conservatives, who, like Young Englanders, were appalled at the despiritualising effects of industrialisation and the perceived amorality of Benthamite philosophy, which they blamed equally for Victorian social injustices. Thus, Young England was inspired by the same reaction to individualistic and rationalistic Radicalism that engendered the Oxford Movement, the Evangelical movement, and the Social Toryism of Robert Peel and Lord Ashley, as well as literary medievalism: the works of Walter Scott, Robert Southey, Kenelm Henry Digby, and Thomas Carlyle were "throughly read" and absorbed early on. The association of Young England with Tractarianism can be traced to the early influence of Frederick Faber (1814–1863), a follower of John Henry Newman, upon Lord John Manners and George Smythe.

Like the founders of the Oxford Movement who ardently opposed the Victorian Radicalism centred in competitive economic self-determination, the founders of Young England rejected utilitarian ethics, blamed the privileged class for abdicating its moral leadership, and blamed the church for neglecting its duties to the poor, among them alms-giving. Expanding the Tractarians' reverence for the religious past to include a reactionary political agenda, Young England claimed to have found the model for a new Victorian social order in England's Christian feudal past.

Like Evangelicalism, Young England reflected the enthusiasm for confronting the middle-class crisis of Victorian conscience. In their advocacy of an exclusive, though tolerant, ecclesiastical authority, Young England's plan for a revitalised state church followed Coleridge's conception of an English clerisy.

== Literature ==
Disraeli had outlined the principles of Young England in The Vindication of the English Constitution (1835), which characteristically opens with an attack on utilitarian beliefs, but Lord John Manners and George Smythe more widely disseminated its neo-feudal ideals in verse and narrative forms.

Like Manners' England's Trust and Plea for National Holy-days (1843), George Smythe's Historic Fancies (1844) earnestly imagines a revival of feudalism, but the solutions both Manners and Smythe offer for industrial disorder are, in spite of the increasingly urban character of Victorian society, chiefly agrarian.

Disraeli's trilogy Coningsby (1844), Sybil (1845), and Tancred (1847) details the intellectual arguments of Young England while showing an informed sympathy for England's poor. Tancred, however, noted a move away from the ideals of Young England and was published at a time when Young England as a political group was largely defunct.

The three novels respectively elaborate the political, social, and religious message of Young England, which included reform of industrial working conditions and, along with a strong Established church, the religious toleration of Catholics and Jews.

== Political role ==
In their political activities, Young England relied on the effectiveness of their alliance-building in Parliament and made itself heard politically in the 1840s. Most of what Young England accomplished in the House of Commons was accomplished through temporary coalitions with both the Social Tories and the Radicals. Fighting against the New Poor Law with the Social Tories, they also at times sided with the Benthamites, as in 1844, when Young England helped the radicals defeat a bill which would have strengthened the powers of magistrates dealing with labour disputes.

== Decline ==
Attesting to its fragile and narrow political base, Young England died with scarcely an obituary some few years after 1847, when Disraeli effectively withdrew from the Parliamentary coalition. Disraeli's disagreements were chiefly with his longtime conservative rival, Peel, although a tempering of his unqualified support for Young England's social-political ideals surfaces in his novel Tancred, or the New Crusade.

At least two years earlier, Disraeli's political opportunism already had damaged Young England's credibility. In 1845, Disraeli opposed the Maynooth Grant Bill, a legislative act that permanently increased the funding of the Roman Catholic seminary at Maynooth in Ireland.

Further, Disraeli's opposition to the repeal of the Corn Laws in 1846 tied him more closely to the landed aristocratic interests.

== Legacy ==
Unlike Social Toryism, which it resembled philosophically, Young England did not survive to confront and oppose the socialist revival of the 1880s. At its best, Young England influenced mid-Victorian reform legislation but never came close to gaining the popular support required to realise even partially its deeply conservative social vision.

The utopian, neo-feudal dreams of Manners, Smythe, and Disraeli reflect the same crisis of Victorian conscience that inspired the similarly utopian Owenite socialism of the political left. Like Owenism, Young England soon failed, but, too ambitiously conservative in a new democratic era, it failed quietly, without experiment.

Karl Marx cites young England as an example of Reactionary socialism in The Communist Manifesto.
