= Kenelm Henry Digby =

Kenelm Henry Digby (c. 1797–1880) was an Anglo-Irish writer, whose reputation rests chiefly on his earliest publication, The Broad-Stone of Honour, or Rules for the Gentlemen of England (1822), which contains an exhaustive survey of medieval customs. The work was subsequently enlarged and issued (1828–29) in four volumes, entitled Godefridus, Tancredus, Morus and Orlandus.

Digby's exposure to Walter Scott's novel Ivanhoe as a youth encouraged him to romanticize the Middle Ages. Broad-Stone contributed to the Young England movement's feudalist ideology and influenced many of Digby's Cambridge contemporaries. The book inculcated in readers ideas of chivalry and staunch Catholicism and stressed the importance of the heart’s knowledge over intellectual learning, presenting historical figures as role models. Digby's revival of medieval principles helped young men of his day construct their idea of what being a "gentleman" means.

== Life ==
Born at Clonfert in County Galway, he was 15 when his father died in 1812. He moved to England to attend Petersham High School near London. From 1816 to 1819, he went to Trinity College, Cambridge, where some members of the university advocated reform and even republicanism; Digby, however, favoured a strong monarchy, the Church, and chivalry. At Cambridge, he read Alfred Tennyson and Arthur Hallam; his close friends there were George Darby, Julius Hare, William Whewell, and Adam Sedgwick. In summer, he travelled across Europe sketching old castles and writing.

Ehrenbreitstein Fortress, a massive medieval fortification in Germany, gave him the title The Broad-Stone of Honour. He published the book in a single volume in 1822, and the beliefs he explored while writing it seem to have contributed to his conversion to Catholicism in 1825. After that, he rewrote and expanded the one volume into four, published in 1828–29: Godfridus, containing a general introduction (named after Godfrey of Boulogne, a Crusade hero); Tancredus, discussing chivalry’s discipline and applauding Christianity (for Tancred, Prince of Galilee, another Crusade hero); Morus, bashing the Reformation as the death of chivalry and religion (after Sir Thomas More); and Orlandus, which detailed Digby's idea of chivalric behaviour (after Ariosto's Orlando Furioso).

From 1831 to 1841, Digby published Mores Catholici, or Ages of Faith, an eleven-volume "panegyric" on the medieval period. It was often referred to by Catholic writers, and sections of it were reprinted as late as 1942.
