= One-nation conservatism =

British political philosophy

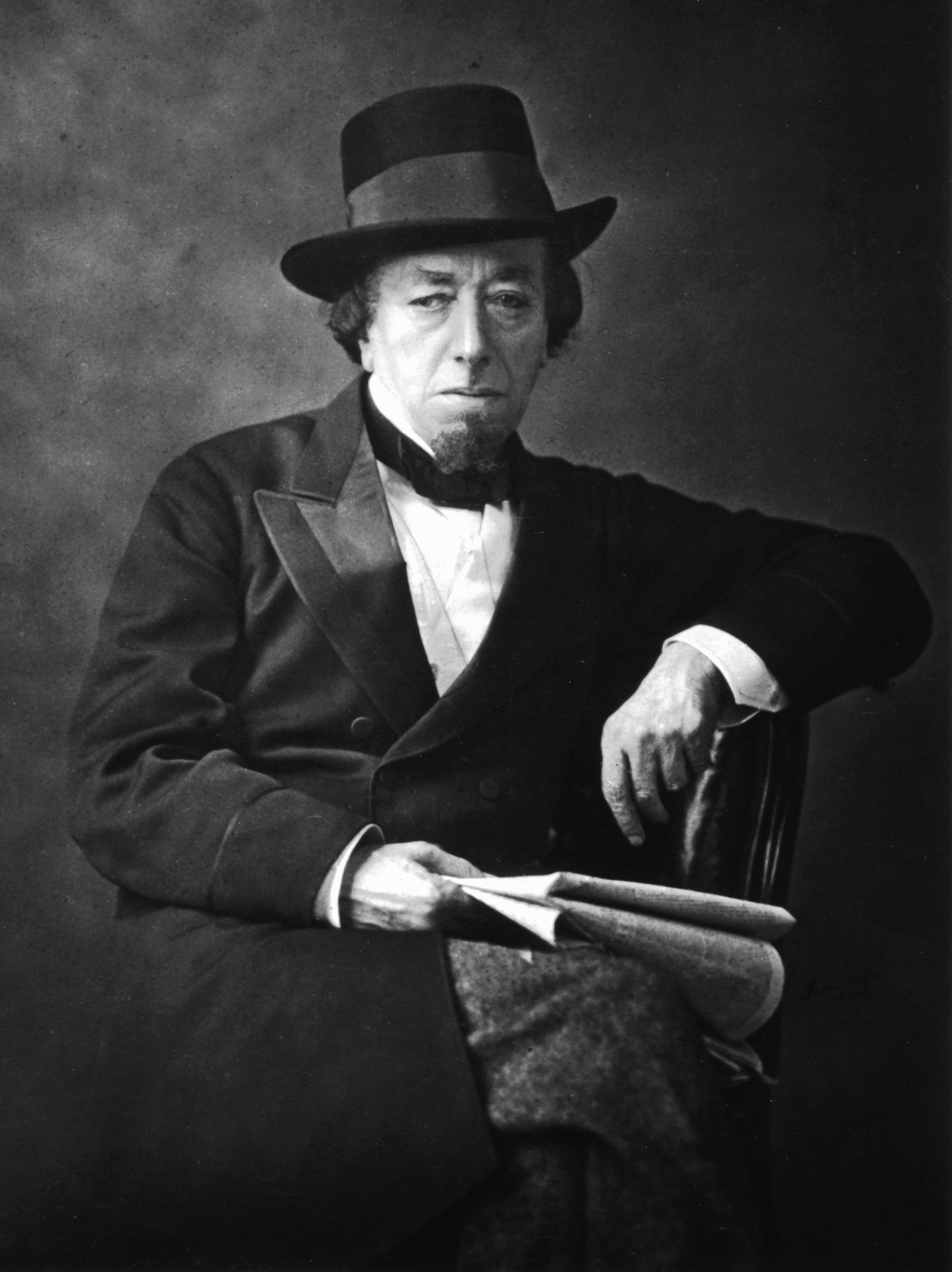
Benjamin Disraeli, the architect of one-nation conservatism

One-nation conservatism, also known as one-nationism or Tory democracy, is a form of British political conservatism and a variant of paternalistic conservatism. It advocates the "preservation of established institutions and traditional principles within a political democracy, in combination with social and economic programmes designed to benefit the ordinary person". According to this political philosophy, society should be allowed to develop in an organic way, rather than being engineered. It argues that members of society have obligations towards each other and particularly emphasises charity (and, sometimes, paternalism), meaning that those who are privileged and wealthy should pass on their benefits. It argues that this elite should work to reconcile the interests of all social classes, including labour and management, rather than identifying the good of society solely with the interests of the business class.

The descriptive phrase 'one-nation Tory' originated with Benjamin Disraeli (1804–1881), who served as the chief Conservative spokesman and became prime minister in February 1868. He devised it to appeal to working-class people, who he hoped would see it as a way to improve their lives via factory and health acts as well as greater protection for workers. The ideology featured heavily during Disraeli's two terms in government, during which considerable social reforms were passed by the Parliament of the United Kingdom. Towards the end of the 19th century, the Conservative Party moved away from paternalism in favour of free market capitalism. In the first half of the 20th century, fears of extremism saw a revival of one-nation Conservatism. The Conservative Party continued to espouse the philosophy throughout the post-war consensus from 1945. One-nation thinking influenced their tolerance of the Labour government's Keynesian intervention in the economy, formation of a welfare state and the National Health Service. Thanks to Iain Macleod, Edward Heath and Enoch Powell, special attention after 1950 was paid to one-nation conservatism that promised support for the poorer and working class elements in the Party coalition.

Later years saw the rise of the New Right, espoused by leaders such as Margaret Thatcher. This strand of conservatism rejected one-nation thinking and attributed the country's social and economic troubles to the welfare state and Keynesian policies. In the 21st century, leaders of the Conservative Party revived the one-nation approach including David Cameron, Theresa May and Boris Johnson — although Johnson's position as a one-nation conservative has been heavily disputed.

== Political philosophy ==
One-nation conservatism was conceived by Benjamin Disraeli, a British prime minister of the Conservative Party, who outlines his political philosophy in two of his novels: Coningsby (1844), and Sybil (1845). Disraeli's conservatism proposed a paternalistic society with the social classes intact, but with the working class receiving support from the establishment. He emphasised the importance of social obligation rather than individualism. The phrase was coined because Disraeli feared a Britain divided into two nations, one of the rich and one of the poor, as a result of increased industrialisation and inequality. One-nation conservatism was his solution to this division, namely a system of measures to improve the lives of the people, provide social support and protect the working classes.

Disraeli justified his ideas by his belief in an organic society in which the different classes have natural obligations to one another. He saw society as naturally hierarchical and emphasised the obligations of those at the top to those below. This was a continuation of the feudal concept of noblesse oblige, which asserted that the aristocracy had an obligation to be generous and honourable. To Disraeli, this implied that government should be paternalistic. Unlike the New Right of the late 20th century, one-nation conservatism identifies its approach as pragmatic and non-ideological. Its proponents would say that it accepts the need for flexible policies and as such one-nation conservatives have often sought compromise with their ideological opponents for the sake of social stability. Disraeli justified his views pragmatically by arguing that should the ruling class become indifferent to the suffering of the people, society would become unstable and social revolution would become a possibility.

== History ==
One-nation conservatism has its origins in the repercussions of the Industrial Revolution, which had caused widespread inequality, poverty and social discontent in Britain. Tory politicians such as Richard Oastler, Michael Thomas Sadler and Lord Shaftesbury combined their elitist responsibility and a strong humanitarian element with their involvement in the Factory Acts. They were critical of individualism and classical economics, they also disliked the 1834 New Poor Law and believed in the role of the state in guaranteeing decent housing, working conditions, wages and treatment of the poor.

Disraeli adopted one-nation conservatism for both ethical and electoral reasons. Before he became leader of the Conservative Party, he persuaded his cabinet colleagues to introduce the Reform Act 1867 which enfranchised much of the skilled male working-class. Disraeli argued that the party needed to pursue social reforms if it were to have electoral success with this new constituency. He felt that one-nationism would both improve the conditions of the poor and portray the Liberal Party as selfish individualists.

While in government, Disraeli presided over a series of social reforms which supported his one-nation politics and aimed to create a benevolent hierarchy. He appointed a Royal Commission to assess the state of law between employers and employees. As a result, Richard Cross was moved to pass the Employers and Workmen Act 1875. This act made both sides of industry equal before the law and the breach of contract became a civil offence, rather than criminal. Cross also passed the Conspiracy, and Protection of Property Act in the same year which enshrined the worker's right to strike by ensuring that acts carried out by a workers' group could not be indicted as conspiracy.

By the end of the 19th century, the Conservatives had moved away from their one-nation ideology and were increasingly supportive of unrestricted capitalism and free enterprise. During the interwar period between 1919 and 1939, public fear of Bolshevism restored the Conservative Party to one-nationism. It defined itself as the party of national unity and began to support moderate reform. As the effects of the Great Depression were felt in Britain, the party was drawn to even greater levels of state intervention. Conservative prime ministers Neville Chamberlain and Stanley Baldwin pursued an interventionist, one-nation approach which won support because of its wide electoral appeal. Throughout the post-war consensus of the 1950s and 1960s, the Conservative Party continued to be dominated by one-nation conservatives whose ideas were inspired by Disraeli. The philosophy was updated and developed by the new conservatism movement led by Rab Butler. New conservatism attempted to distinguish itself from the socialism of Anthony Crosland by concentrating welfare on those in need and encouraging people to help themselves, rather than foster dependency on the state.

Until the mid-1970s, the Conservative Party was mostly controlled by one-nation conservatives. The rise of the New Right in conservative politics led to a critique of one-nation conservatism. The New Right thinkers contended that Keynesianism and the welfare state had damaged the economy and society. The Winter of Discontent of 1978–1979 in which trades unions took industrial action with a wide impact on daily life was portrayed by the New Right as illustrative of the over-extension of the state. Figures such as Margaret Thatcher believed that to reverse the national decline it was necessary to revive old values of individualism and challenge the dependency culture which they felt had been created by the welfare state. One-nation conservatives such as Edward Heath continued to criticise Thatcher's premiership during the early 1980s recession, but they lost influence after the party won the 1983 general election.

The Conservative Party's 2010 general election manifesto contained a section on "One World Conservatism", including a commitment to spend 0.7% of national income on well-targeted aid. In 2006, Conservative Member of Parliament (MP) Andrew Tyrie published a pamphlet which claimed that party leader David Cameron was following the one-nationist path of Disraeli. Phillip Blond, a British political theorist who has had past connections with the Conservative Party, has proposed a renewed version of one-nation conservatism.

Theresa May promoted "One Nation" ideas during her successful bid for the Tory leadership in 2016. Previously in 2002 she had highlighted that the party was known as the "Nasty Party".

Also in 2010, the then London Mayor and prominent Conservative (and later prime minister) Boris Johnson explained his political philosophy as such:

I'm a one-nation Tory. There is a duty on the part of the rich to the poor and to the needy, but you are not going to help people express that duty and satisfy it if you punish them fiscally so viciously that they leave this city and this country. I want London to be a competitive, dynamic place to come to work.

In 2019, a One Nation Conservative caucus was formed in Parliament.

Contemporary British one-nation conservative think tanks include Bright Blue, Onward, Centre for Policy Studies, and the Centre for Social Justice.

== See also ==
- Big Society
- Blue Labour
- Christian democracy
- Class collaboration
- Gaullism
- Noblesse oblige
- One Nation Labour
- Red Tory
- Wets and dries

== Bibliography ==
- Adams, Ian (1998). Ideology and Politics in Britain Today. Manchester University Press. ISBN 978-0719050565.
- Arnold, Dana (2004). Cultural Identities and the Aesthetics of Britishness. Manchester University Press. ISBN 978-0719067693.
- Axford, Barrie; Browning, Gary; Huggins, Richard (2002). Politics: An Introduction. Routledge. ISBN 978-0415251815.
- Blake, Robert (1966). Disraeli. New York: St. Martin's Press. ISBN 0-19-832903-2.
- Bloor, Kevin (2012). The Definitive Guide to Political Ideologies. AuthorHouse. ISBN 978-1449067618.
- Bochel, Hugh (2010). "One Nation Conservatism and social policy, 1951–64" (PDF). Journal of Poverty and Social Justice. 18 (2): 123–134. doi:10.1332/175982710X513795. Archived from the original (PDF) on 8 December 2019.
- Bridgen, P. (2000). "The One Nation Idea and State Welfare: The Conservatives and Pensions in the 1950s". Contemporary British History. 14 (3): 83–104. doi:10.1080/13619460008581595.
- Dorey, Peter (1995). The Conservative Party and the Trade Unions. Psychology Press. ISBN 978-0415064873.
- Dorey, Peter (2009). British Conservatism and Trade Unionism, 1945–1964. Ashgate Publishing. ISBN 978-0754666592.
- Dorey, Peter; Garnett, Mark (2015). "'The weaker-willed, the craven-hearted': the decline of One Nation Conservatism". Global Discourse. 5 (1): 69–91. doi:10.1080/23269995.2014.914823.
- Evans, Eric (2004). Thatcher and Thatcherism. Routledge. ISBN 978-0415270137.
- Evans, Stephen. (2009). "The not so odd couple: Margaret Thatcher and one nation Conservatism". Contemporary British History. 23 (1): 101–121. doi:10.1080/13619460801990120. S2CID 143943408.
- Heppell, Timothy; Seawright, David (2012). Cameron and the Conservatives: The Transition to Coalition Government. Palgrave Macmillan. ISBN 9780230314108.
- Heywood, Andrew (2007). Political Ideologies. Palgrave Macmillan. ISBN 978-0230521803.
- Lind, Michael (1997). Up from Conservatism. Simon & Schuster. ISBN 0-684-83186-4.
- Vincent, Andrew (2009). Modern Political Ideologies. John Wiley & Sons. ISBN 978-1-444-31105-1.
- Walsha, Robert (2003). "The one nation group and one nation Conservatism, 1950–2002". Contemporary British History. 17 (2): 69–120.
- Walsha, Robert (2000). "The One Nation Group: A Tory approach to backbench politics or organization, 1950–55". Twentieth Century British History. 11 (2): 183–214. doi:10.1093/tcbh/11.2.183.

Data related to One-nation conservatism at Wikidata
