= Sybil (novel) =

1845 novel by Benjamin Disraeli

Sybil; or, The Two Nations
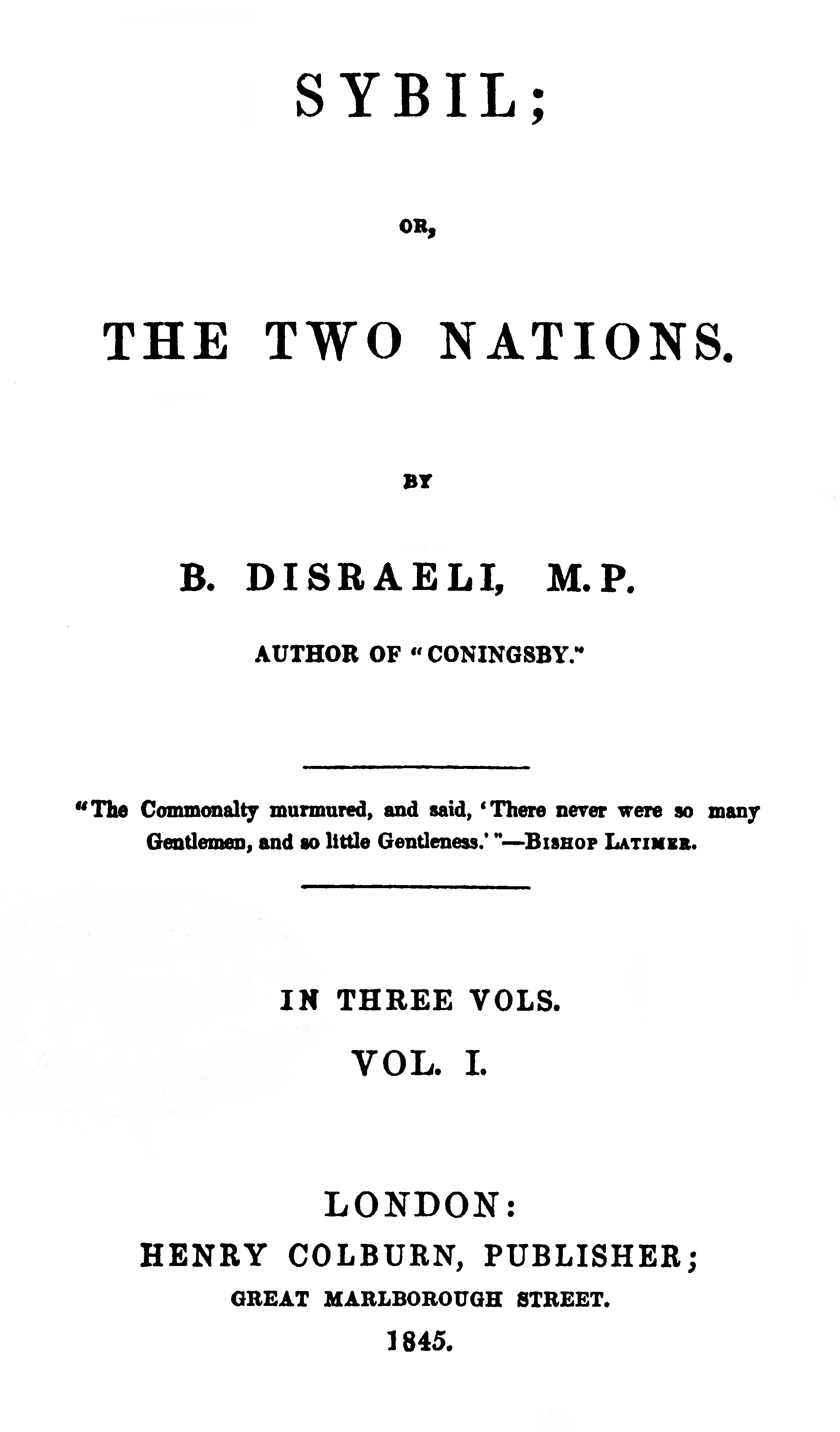
- First edition title page
- Author: Benjamin Disraeli
- Language: English
- Series: Young England trilogy
- Genre: Fiction
- Publisher: Henry Colburn
- Publication date: 1845
- Publication place: United Kingdom

Sybil, or The Two Nations is an 1845 novel by Benjamin Disraeli. Published in the same year as Friedrich Engels's The Condition of the Working Class in England in 1844, Sybil traces the plight of the working classes of England. Disraeli was interested in dealing with the horrific conditions in which the majority of England's working classes lived — or, what is generally called the Condition of England question.

== Political context ==
The book is a roman à thèse, or a novel with a thesis — which was meant to create a furor over the squalor that was plaguing England's working class cities.

Disraeli's interest in this subject stemmed from his interest in the Chartist movement, a working-class political reformist movement that sought universal male suffrage and other parliamentary reforms. (Thomas Carlyle sums up the movement in his 1839 book Chartism.) Chartism failed as a parliamentary movement (three petitions to Parliament were rejected); however, five of the "Six Points" of Chartism would become a reality within a century of the group's formation.

Chartism demanded:

1. Universal suffrage for men
2. Secret ballot
3. Removal of property requirements for Parliament
4. Salaries for Members of Parliament (MPs)
5. Equal electoral districts
6. Annually elected Parliament

Disraeli was particularly inspired by the Royal Commission of Inquiry into Children's Employment, which published a report interviewing working children in 1842. Sybil examines the moral corruption inherent in forcing children to work under such unpleasant conditions. The characters of the sixteen-year-old Dandy Mick and Devilsdust, who is abandoned by his mother and left to fend for himself, are particularly emblematic of this.

== Characters ==
- Sybil Gerard
- Charles Egremont
- Lord Marney
- Lord Henry Sydney
- Lord de Mowbray
- Rigby
- Taper
- Tadpole
- Lady St. Julians
- Marchioness of Deloraine
- Baptist Hatton
- Aubrey St. Lys
- Sidonia
- Devilsdust
- Dandy Mick
- Walter Gerard (Sybil's father)
- Stephen Morley
- Mr. Mountchesney

== Adaptations ==
Disraeli's novel was made into a silent film called Sybil in 1921, starring Evelyn Brent and Cowley Wright.

The Difference Engine, a 1990 steampunk novel written by William Gibson and Bruce Sterling, contains alternate versions of several characters from Sybil, including Sybil Gerard, Walter Gerard, Charles Egremont and Dandy Mick. It also features Disraeli himself as a character.

== See also ==
- One Nation Conservatism
- Coningsby (novel)
- Tancred (novel)
- Two Americas

== Bibliography ==
=== Editions ===
There is no critical edition of Disraeli's novels. Most editions use the text of Longmans Collected Edition (1870–71).

- Disraeli, Benjamin Sybil. (Harmondsworth: Penguin, 1987) ISBN 0-14-043134-9. Edited with an introduction by Rab Butler and notes by Thom Braun.
- Disraeli, Benjamin Sybil. (Oxford: Oxford University Press, 1998) ISBN 0-19-283693-5. Edited with an introduction and notes by Sheila Smith.

=== Works of criticism ===
- Braun, Thom Disraeli The Novelist. (London: George Allen & Unwin, 1981) ISBN 0-04-809017-4.
