= Coningsby (novel) =

1844 political novel by Benjamin Disraeli

Coningsby, or The New Generation is an English political novel by Benjamin Disraeli, published in 1844.

== Background ==
Coningsby (1844 First Edition) was the first of a trilogy of novels (together with Sybil and Tancred) which marked a departure from Disraeli's silver-fork novels of the 1830s and which are his most famous.

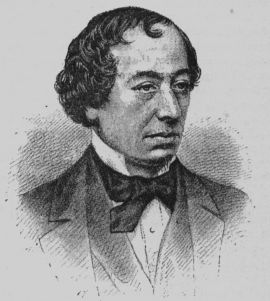
Benjamin Disraeli

The book is set against a background of the real political events of the 1830s in England that followed the enactment of the Reform Bill of 1832. In describing these events Disraeli sets out his own beliefs including his opposition to Robert Peel, his dislikes of both the British Whig Party and the ideals of Utilitarianism, and the need for social justice in a newly industrialized society. He portrays the self-serving politician in the character of Rigby (based on John Wilson Croker) and the malicious party insiders in the characters of Taper and Tadpole.

In Coningsby Disraeli articulates a "Tory interpretation" of history to combat the "accepted [Whig] orthodoxy of the day" which was highly influenced by Thomas Carlyle's Heroes and Hero-Worship (1841). In this interpretation the Whigs have emasculated three great institutions (the monarchy, the church and "the people") so as to rule in their own interest. Disraeli is very critical of the Tory party after the death of Pitt (describing the Tory Prime Minister of 15 years Lord Liverpool as the "arch-mediocrity") believing that it had abandoned "true Toryism" to become "Political Infidelity". This manifests itself in Coningsby's eponymous hero refusing the opportunity to stand as a Conservative parliamentary candidate even though he is opposed to the Whigs. As an alternative or a remedy, Coningsby and his young contemporaries articulate the "Young England" creed which Disraeli was associated with at the time.

== Plot ==
=== Summary ===
The novel follows the life and career of Henry Coningsby, the orphan grandson of a wealthy marquess, Lord Monmouth. Lord Monmouth initially disapproved of Coningsby's parents' marriage, but on their death he relents and sends the boy to be educated at Eton College. At Eton Coningsby meets and befriends Oswald Millbank, the son of a rich cotton manufacturer who is a bitter enemy of Lord Monmouth. The two older men represent old and new wealth in society.

As Coningsby grows up he begins to develop his own liberal political views, and falls in love with Oswald's sister Edith. When Lord Monmouth discovers these developments he is furious and secretly disinherits his grandson. On his death, Coningsby is left penniless, and is forced to work for his living. He decides to study law and become a barrister. This proof of his character impresses Edith's father (who had previously also been hostile) and he consents to their marriage at last. By the end of the novel Coningsby is elected to Parliament for his new father-in-law's constituency and his fortune is restored.

According to Disraeli's biographer, Robert Blake, the character of Sidonia is a cross between Lionel de Rothschild and Disraeli himself. The character of Coningsby is based on George Smythe.

The themes, and some of the characters, reappear in Disraeli's later novels Sybil and Tancred.

=== Detail ===
Harry Coningsby was the charge of his grandfather (Lord Monmouth) after his parents died. Coningsby first met his grandfather, who was often out of the country on government business, when he was aged about 9 and was so overwhelmed, he could only cry. Coningsby was brought up in his grandfather's political entourage including the critical and self-righteous (but often wrong) Mr Rigby and the two political hacks, Tadpole and Taper.

Coningsby went to Eton where, in a rafting incident, he saved the life of a son of a wealthy manufacturer (Oswald Millbank). Out walking one day shortly after leaving Eton, Coningsby takes refuge from a storm in an inn where he is captivated by a flamboyant traveller talking about young people needing to drive things forward and of the end of the “Age of Ruins”. Coningsby is now well integrated into upper class sets where he befriends a number of like-minded young gentlemen who look up to him as their leader.

On a trip to Manchester, Coningsby decides to visit Millbank who is abroad and so he is entertained by Millbank's father and his shy but beautiful 16-year-old sister, Edith.

With Lord Monmouth's return to England, Coningsby is invited to the family seat for the first time for a massive reception including a play which features the stage debut of Flora “La Petite” the daughter of a great deceased actress and whom Lord Monmouth has taken under his wing. Flora does well but breaks down in tears and Coningsby alone goes backstage to sympathise. Guests are also dazzled by the arrival of the man Coningsby met in the inn, Sidonia (an ardent Jewish nationalist), who also impresses Princess Lucretia, who was being lined up by her step mother, Madame Colonna, as a potential wife for Coningsby.

Shortly afterwards, the owner of Lord Monmouth's adjoining estate dies with no heirs but Lord Monmouth's bid to buy his land (Hellingsley) is thwarted by Millbank senior. Their rivalry is accentuated when Monmouth's Tory candidate for the local parliamentary seat (Rigby) is defeated by the Liberal candidate, Millbank snr. In disgust Monmouth resolves to leave the country but announces his surprise marriage to Lucretia. Meanwhile, Flora is becoming more withdrawn and is unable to sing so frequently.

After his first year at university, Coningsby goes to Paris to meet his grandfather. He is shown some of his father's old possessions in a banker's safe including a portrait of a woman, presumably Coningsby's mother, which he had also seen at Milbank's home. Whilst visiting an art gallery he observes a beautiful young woman who turns out to be Edith Millbank and they are reacquainted at a grand ball Lord Monmouth holds the following evening. Shortly afterwards Coningsby hears that Sidonia is to marry Edith and abruptly leaves Paris.

A year later, Coningsby encounters Edith's aunt and learns that the rumour about Edith and Sidonia's marriage was false. Edith is now staying at Hellingsley so Coningsby returns to his grandfather's estate, visits Edith and they both declare their love to each other. However the next day, Edith's father bans Coningsby from seeing her again since their families cannot be linked. During the conversation the mystery of the portrait is resolved as it emerges that Millbank was in love with Coningsby's mother but Coningsby's father poached her from him.

A year later Coningsby and Edith exchange glances and a few words at a ball. Edith is on the arm of a potential suitor, Lord Beaumanoir, and Coningsby is thought to be about to wed Lady Theresa. Coningsby is summoned by Lord Monmouth, who is now estranged from Lucretia, in part because he is now aware of her affection for Sidonia. Monmouth has intelligence that an election is imminent and wants Coningsby to be the Tory candidate, but Coningsby refuses because he cannot support the Conservatives since he does not know what they want to conserve and anyway is an opponent of the status quo.

Monmouth then summons Rigby, whom Lucretia intercepts. They hatch a plot to discredit Coningsby in the eyes of Lord Monmouth by telling him about his love for Edith. The plan backfires with Monmouth ordering Lucretia to leave his house, although he does leave Rigby in charge whilst he goes travelling.

Through various meetings, Coningsby learns that Edith is not engaged to Lord Beaumanoir and she learns he is not engaged to Lady Theresa, when her wedding to a friend of Coningsby is announced. Edith and Coningsby resolve to get back together. On hearing about Lucretia's eviction, Coningsby goes to visit his grandfather who refuses to see him, a decision he later regrets and resolves to amend.

At a Christmas party shortly afterwards hosted by one of Coningsby's school friends, news arrives that Lord Monmouth has died. Monmouth had a habit of changing his will and the latest version bequeaths next to nothing to Coningsby, the bulk of his wealth being left to Flora who turns out to be his daughter. Flora, her health failing, offers to give it all to Coningsby on account of his kindness to her but he refuses.

With no income or wealth, Coningsby takes up law studies with the aim of eventually becoming Lord Chancellor. He realises that he now has nothing to offer Edith and abandons hope of being with her. Meanwhile, her father finds out that he was cut from Monmouth's will on account of his love for Edith and so at the forthcoming election he stands down as a candidate in favour of Coningsby who, without being aware of his candidacy, handsomely defeats Rigby at the ensuing election.

Coningsby returns triumphantly to his constituency and Millbank snr. grants permission for him to marry Edith. Flora dies, leaving her wealth to Coningsby. The novel ends with a series of questions asking whether or not Coningsby will be true to his principles and beliefs in his Parliamentary career.

== Reception ==
3,000 copies of the first edition were sold, earning its author around £1,000.

== Characters ==
- Philip Augustus, Marquess of Monmouth (Lord Cardiff)
- Henry Coningsby, Esq.
- Sir Charles Buckhurst
- Lord Eskdale
- Duke of Beaumanoir
- Lord Henry Sydney
- Lord Vere
- Lord Fitz-Booby
- Sir Joseph Wallinger
- Lady Wallinger
- Oswald Millbank
- Edith Millbank
- Paul Prince Colonna
- Madame Colonna
- Lucretia Princess Colonna
- Lucian Gay
- Mr. Nicolas Rigby
- Mr. Taper
- Mr. Tadpole
- Mr. Ormsby
- Armand Villebecque
- Marie Estelle Matteau (Stella)
- Flora Villebecque (La Petite)
- Sidonia

== See also ==
- Barrow Bridge, Bolton
- Politics in fiction
- Young England
