= Chapter 7 (House of Cards) =

- House of Cards episode
- Episode no.: Season 1 Episode 7
- Directed by: Charles McDougall
- Written by: Kate Barnow; Beau Willimon
- Cinematography by: Eigil Bryld
- Editing by: Michelle Tesoro; Sidney Wolinsky
- Production code: HOC-107
- Original release date: February 1, 2013
- Running time: 53 minutes

Episode chronology
← Previous "Chapter 6"	Next → "Chapter 8"
- House of Cards (season 1)

"Chapter 7" is the seventh episode of the first season of the American political thriller drama series House of Cards. Written by Kate Barnow and series creator Beau Willimon, and directed by Charles McDougall, the episode premiered on February 1, 2013, when it was released along with the rest of the first season on the American streaming service Netflix.

== Plot ==
President Walker (Michel Gill) finally signs the education bill, earning Frank (Kevin Spacey) a major victory by affording him great influence with Walker. Vice President Jim Matthews (Dan Ziskie) expresses discontent with Walker, feeling sidelined within the administration. Matthews further questions Russo's (Corey Stoll) ability to run for governor of Pennsylvania, the office Matthews previously occupied.

Doug (Michael Kelly) receives a letter from Rachel Posner (Rachel Brosnahan), who asks for money and a place to live in return for her silence regarding Russo's DUI arrest. Frank turns his basement into Russo's de facto campaign headquarters while Russo continuously attends Alcoholics Anonymous meetings with Doug. However, when confronting his past wrongdoings, Russo starts to have doubts about his campaign.

Frank contacts Christina (Kristen Connolly) to get back together with Russo and become his deputy campaign manager. Doug asks Nancy (Elizabeth Norment) to house Rachel until he finds a suitable place for her. After not hearing from Frank for several weeks, Zoe texts him and asks his whereabouts. Frank tells her about Russo's campaign. She gives the scoop to Janine, who is considering leaving the Herald for Slugline. Frank visits Zoe's apartment and sees Lucas (Sebastian Arcelus) kissing her. Afterwards, Frank lays Zoe gently on the bed. Then he pushes her dress up to just below her belly button. He then pulls down her black panties and takes them off her. He then performs cunnilingus on Zoe while she is on the phone with her father.

== Cast ==
=== Main ===
- Kevin Spacey as U.S. Representative Francis J. Underwood
- Robin Wright as Claire Underwood, Francis' wife
- Kate Mara as Zoe Barnes, reporter at The Washington Herald
- Michael Kelly as Doug Stamper, Underwood's Chief of Staff
- Sakina Jaffrey as Linda Vasquez, White House Chief of Staff
- Corey Stoll as U.S. Representative Peter Russo
- Kristen Connolly as Christina Gallagher, a congressional staffer
- Sandrine Holt as Gillian Cole, employee at CWI
- Ben Daniels as Adam Galloway, a New York-based photographer and Claire's love interest
- Boris McGiver as Tom Hammerschmidt, editor-in-chief for The Washington Herald
- Sebastian Arcelus as Lucas Goodwin, a reporter and editor for The Washington Herald
- Michel Gill as United States President Garrett Walker
- Dan Ziskie as Vice President Jim Matthews

=== Recurring ===
- Elizabeth Norment as Nancy Kaufberger
- Nathan Darrow as Edward Meechum
- Constance Zimmer as Janine Skorsky
- Karl Kenzler as Charles Holburn
- Francie Swift as Felicity Holburn
- Rachel Brosnahan as Rachel Posner
- Larry Pine as Bob Birch
- Suzanne Savoy as Patricia Whittaker
- Tawny Cypress as Carly Heath
- Kenneth Tigar as Walter Doyle
- James Hindman as Nash Aarons
- Chuck Cooper as Barney Hull
- Curtiss Cook as Terry Womack

== Reception ==
The episode received positive reviews from critics. Ryan McGee of The A.V. Club said, "The show now has earned enough goodwill to not dismiss that plot out of hand, even if it feels designed to either pay off something in four episodes or utterly snatch defeat from the jaws of victory at precisely the same time. The show hasn't had to get truly bloody when tying off loose ends yet." He further said, "it's probably time for the show to introduce some truly life-or-death stakes for this to move beyond interesting television into something truly compelling."

== Notes ==
- This article incorporates material derived from the "Chapter 7" article on the House of Cards wiki at Fandom (formerly Wikia) and is licensed under the Creative Commons Attribution-Share Alike 3.0 License (116 September 2016).
