= List of House of Cards episodes =

House of Cards is an American political drama television series created by Beau Willimon for Netflix. The first season, based on the BBC miniseries of the same name and the series of books by Michael Dobbs, premiered exclusively via Netflix's web streaming service on February 1, 2013.

Kevin Spacey stars as Representative Francis Underwood, the Majority Whip, who, after being passed up for the position of Secretary of State, initiates an elaborate plan to get himself into a position of greater power, aided by his wife, Claire Underwood (Robin Wright). Spacey was not featured in the sixth and final season, as he was fired from the show due to sexual misconduct allegations.

During the course of the series, 73 episodes of House of Cards were released over six seasons, between February 1, 2013, and November 2, 2018.

== Series overview ==
Season	Episodes	Originally released
1	13	February 1, 2013
2	13	February 14, 2014
3	13	February 27, 2015
4	13	March 4, 2016
5	13	May 30, 2017
6	8	November 2, 2018

== Episodes ==
=== Season 1 (2013) ===
No. overall	No. in season	Title	Directed by	Written by	Original release date	Prod. code
1	1	"Chapter 1"	David Fincher	Beau Willimon	February 1, 2013	HOC-101
2	2	"Chapter 2"	David Fincher	Beau Willimon	February 1, 2013	HOC-102
3	3	"Chapter 3"	James Foley	Keith Huff and Beau Willimon	February 1, 2013	HOC-103
4	4	"Chapter 4"	James Foley	Rick Cleveland and Beau Willimon	February 1, 2013	HOC-104
5	5	"Chapter 5"	Joel Schumacher	Sarah Treem	February 1, 2013	HOC-105
6	6	"Chapter 6"	Joel Schumacher	Sam Forman	February 1, 2013	HOC-106
7	7	"Chapter 7"	Charles McDougall	Kate Barnow and Beau Willimon	February 1, 2013	HOC-107
8	8	"Chapter 8"	Charles McDougall	Beau Willimon	February 1, 2013	HOC-108
9	9	"Chapter 9"	James Foley	Beau Willimon and Rick Cleveland	February 1, 2013	HOC-109
10	10	"Chapter 10"	Carl Franklin	Sarah Treem	February 1, 2013	HOC-110
11	11	"Chapter 11"	Carl Franklin	Keith Huff and Kate Barnow and Beau Willimon	February 1, 2013	HOC-111
12	12	"Chapter 12"	Allen Coulter	Gina Gionfriddo and Beau Willimon	February 1, 2013	HOC-112
13	13	"Chapter 13"	Allen Coulter	Beau Willimon	February 1, 2013	HOC-113

=== Season 2 (2014) ===
No. overall	No. in season	Title	Directed by	Written by	Original release date	Prod. code
14	1	"Chapter 14"	Carl Franklin	Beau Willimon	February 14, 2014	HOC-201
15	2	"Chapter 15"	Carl Franklin	Beau Willimon	February 14, 2014	HOC-202
16	3	"Chapter 16"	James Foley	Bill Cain	February 14, 2014	HOC-203
17	4	"Chapter 17"	James Foley	Laura Eason	February 14, 2014	HOC-204
18	5	"Chapter 18"	John Coles	Kenneth Lin	February 14, 2014	HOC-205
19	6	"Chapter 19"	John Coles	John Mankiewicz	February 14, 2014	HOC-206
20	7	"Chapter 20"	James Foley	Bill Kennedy	February 14, 2014	HOC-207
21	8	"Chapter 21"	James Foley	David Manson	February 14, 2014	HOC-208
22	9	"Chapter 22"	Jodie Foster	Beau Willimon	February 14, 2014	HOC-209
23	10	"Chapter 23"	Robin Wright	Laura Eason and Beau Willimon	February 14, 2014	HOC-210
24	11	"Chapter 24"	John Coles	John Mankiewicz and Beau Willimon	February 14, 2014	HOC-211
25	12	"Chapter 25"	James Foley	Beau Willimon	February 14, 2014	HOC-212
26	13	"Chapter 26"	James Foley	Beau Willimon	February 14, 2014	HOC-213

=== Season 3 (2015) ===
No. overall	No. in season	Title	Directed by	Written by	Original release date	Prod. code
27	1	"Chapter 27"	John David Coles	Beau Willimon	February 27, 2015	HOC-301
28	2	"Chapter 28"	John David Coles	John Mankiewicz	February 27, 2015	HOC-302
29	3	"Chapter 29"	Tucker Gates	Frank Pugliese	February 27, 2015	HOC-303
30	4	"Chapter 30"	Tucker Gates	Laura Eason	February 27, 2015	HOC-304
31	5	"Chapter 31"	James Foley	Kenneth Lin	February 27, 2015	HOC-305
32	6	"Chapter 32"	James Foley	Melissa James Gibson	February 27, 2015	HOC-306
33	7	"Chapter 33"	John Dahl	Beau Willimon	February 27, 2015	HOC-307
34	8	"Chapter 34"	John Dahl	Bill Kennedy	February 27, 2015	HOC-308
35	9	"Chapter 35"	Robin Wright	John Mankiewicz	February 27, 2015	HOC-309
36	10	"Chapter 36"	Agnieszka Holland	Frank Pugliese	February 27, 2015	HOC-310
37	11	"Chapter 37"	Agnieszka Holland	Melissa James Gibson	February 27, 2015	HOC-311
38	12	"Chapter 38"	Robin Wright	Beau Willimon	February 27, 2015	HOC-312
39	13	"Chapter 39"	James Foley	Beau Willimon	February 27, 2015	HOC-313

=== Season 4 (2016) ===
No. overall	No. in season	Title	Directed by	Written by	Original release date	Prod. code
40	1	"Chapter 40"	Tucker Gates	Beau Willimon	March 4, 2016	HOC-401
41	2	"Chapter 41"	Tucker Gates	Melissa James Gibson	March 4, 2016	HOC-402
42	3	"Chapter 42"	Robin Wright	Frank Pugliese	March 4, 2016	HOC-403
43	4	"Chapter 43"	Robin Wright	John Mankiewicz	March 4, 2016	HOC-404
44	5	"Chapter 44"	Tom Shankland	Kenneth Lin	March 4, 2016	HOC-405
45	6	"Chapter 45"	Tom Shankland	Laura Eason	March 4, 2016	HOC-406
46	7	"Chapter 46"	Tom Shankland	Bill Kennedy	March 4, 2016	HOC-407
47	8	"Chapter 47"	Alex Graves	John Mankiewicz	March 4, 2016	HOC-408
48	9	"Chapter 48"	Robin Wright	Frank Pugliese	March 4, 2016	HOC-409
49	10	"Chapter 49"	Robin Wright	Melissa James Gibson and Kenneth Lin	March 4, 2016	HOC-410
50	11	"Chapter 50"	Kari Skogland	Tian Jun Gu	March 4, 2016	HOC-411
51	12	"Chapter 51"	Jakob Verbruggen	Laura Eason and Bill Kennedy	March 4, 2016	HOC-412
52	13	"Chapter 52"	Jakob Verbruggen	Beau Willimon	March 4, 2016	HOC-413

=== Season 5 (2017) ===
No. overall	No. in season	Title	Directed by	Written by	Original release date	Prod. code
53	1	"Chapter 53"	Daniel Minahan	Frank Pugliese	May 30, 2017	HOC-501
54	2	"Chapter 54"	Daniel Minahan	Melissa James Gibson	May 30, 2017	HOC-502
55	3	"Chapter 55"	Alik Sakharov	John Mankiewicz	May 30, 2017	HOC-503
56	4	"Chapter 56"	Alik Sakharov	Kenneth Lin	May 30, 2017	HOC-504
57	5	"Chapter 57"	Michael Morris	Laura Eason	May 30, 2017	HOC-505
58	6	"Chapter 58"	Michael Morris	Bill Kennedy	May 30, 2017	HOC-506
59	7	"Chapter 59"	Alik Sakharov	Tian Jun Gu	May 30, 2017	HOC-507
60	8	"Chapter 60"	Roxann Dawson	John Mankiewicz	May 30, 2017	HOC-508
61	9	"Chapter 61"	Roxann Dawson	Bill Kennedy	May 30, 2017	HOC-509
62	10	"Chapter 62"	Agnieszka Holland	Kenneth Lin	May 30, 2017	HOC-510
63	11	"Chapter 63"	Agnieszka Holland	Laura Eason	May 30, 2017	HOC-511
64	12	"Chapter 64"	Robin Wright	Frank Pugliese & Melissa James Gibson	May 30, 2017	HOC-512
65	13	"Chapter 65"	Robin Wright	Melissa James Gibson & Frank Pugliese	May 30, 2017	HOC-513

=== Season 6 (2018) ===
No. overall	No. in season	Title	Directed by	Written by	Original release date	Prod. code
66	1	"Chapter 66"	Alik Sakharov	Melissa James Gibson & Frank Pugliese	November 2, 2018	HOC-621
67	2	"Chapter 67"	Ami Canaan Mann	Frank Pugliese & Melissa James Gibson	November 2, 2018	HOC-622
68	3	"Chapter 68"	Stacie Passon	Charlotte Stoudt & Sharon Hoffman	November 2, 2018	HOC-623
69	4	"Chapter 69"	Ernest Dickerson	Jerome Hairston & Tian Jun Gu	November 2, 2018	HOC-624
70	5	"Chapter 70"	Thomas Schlamme	Jason Horwitch & Charlotte Stoudt	November 2, 2018	HOC-625
71	6	"Chapter 71"	Louise Friedberg	Jason Horwitch & Jerome Hairston	November 2, 2018	HOC-626
72	7	"Chapter 72"	Alik Sakharov	Melissa James Gibson & Frank Pugliese	November 2, 2018	HOC-627
73	8	"Chapter 73"	Robin Wright	Frank Pugliese & Melissa James Gibson	November 2, 2018	HOC-628
