= House of Cards season 1 =

Season of the American television drama series House of Cards

House of Cards
- Season 1
- Blu-ray cover
- Showrunner: Beau Willimon
- Starring: Kevin Spacey; Robin Wright; Kate Mara; Corey Stoll; Michael Kelly; Sakina Jaffrey; Kristen Connolly; Sebastian Arcelus; Boris McGiver; Constance Zimmer; Mahershala Ali; Michel Gill; Sandrine Holt; Nathan Darrow; Rachel Brosnahan
- No. of episodes: 13

Release
- Original network: Netflix
- Original release: February 1, 2013

Season chronology
- Next → Season 2

The first season of the American television drama series House of Cards premiered exclusively via Netflix's web streaming service on February 1, 2013. The season was produced by Media Rights Capital, and the executive producers are David Fincher, Kevin Spacey, Eric Roth, Joshua Donen, Dana Brunetti, Andrew Davies, Michael Dobbs, John Melfi, and Beau Willimon.

House of Cards was created for television by Beau Willimon. It is an adaptation of a previous BBC miniseries of the same name by Andrew Davies, which was based on the novel by Michael Dobbs. Set in present-day Washington, D.C., House of Cards is the story of Frank Underwood (Kevin Spacey), a Democrat from South Carolina's 5th congressional district and the House Majority Whip, who, after getting passed over for appointment as Secretary of State, decides to exact his revenge on those who betrayed him. The series also stars Robin Wright, Kate Mara, and Corey Stoll in lead roles.

The fifth and sixth episodes of this season marked the final directing work of Joel Schumacher.

== Cast ==
- Kevin Spacey as Francis J. Underwood, a U.S. Congressman from South Carolina and the House Majority Whip.
- Robin Wright as Claire Underwood, Frank Underwood's wife and the CEO of the Clean Water Initiative, a non-profit organization devoted to environmental awareness.
- Kate Mara as Zoe Barnes, an ambitious young journalist working for the Washington Herald and eventual lover of Frank Underwood.
- Corey Stoll as Peter Russo, a U.S. Congressman from Pennsylvania and eventual candidate for Governor of Pennsylvania.
- Michael Kelly as Douglas "Doug" Stamper, Frank Underwood's loyal Chief of Staff.
- Kristen Connolly as Christina Gallagher, Peter Russo's Chief of Staff and girlfriend.
- Sakina Jaffrey as Linda Vasquez, the White House Chief of Staff in the Walker Administration.
- Sandrine Holt as Gillian Cole, a respected charity worker and eventual employee of Claire Underwood at the CWI.
- Constance Zimmer as Janine Skorsky, a veteran political reporter at the Washington Herald and their White House correspondent.
- Michel Gill as Garrett Walker, the President of the United States and former governor from Colorado.
- Sebastian Arcelus as Lucas Goodwin, a senior political reporter at the Washington Herald.
- Mahershala Ali as Remy Danton, a lobbyist at law firm Glendon Hill who represents SanCorp, a powerful natural gas company.
- Ben Daniels as Adam Galloway, a world-renowned photographer and occasional lover of Claire Underwood.
- Boris McGiver as Tom Hammerschmidt, the editor-in-chief of the Washington Herald.
- Dan Ziskie as Jim Matthews, the Vice President of the United States and former Governor of Pennsylvania.
- Jayne Atkinson as Catherine Durant, the U.S. Secretary of State and former Senator from Louisiana.
- Nathan Darrow as Edward Meechum, a member of the Capitol Police and former U.S. Marine who serves as the new bodyguard for Frank and Claire Underwood.
- Elizabeth Norment as Nancy Kaufberger, secretary for House Majority Whip Frank Underwood.
- Reg E. Cathey as Freddy Hayes, the owner of a BBQ restaurant that is frequented by Frank Underwood.
- Rachel Brosnahan as Rachel Posner, a prostitute desiring to escape her position in life.
- Larry Pine as Speaker of the House of Representatives Bob Birch.
- Tawny Cypress as Carly Heath, the editor-in-chief of news blog Slugline.
- Karl Kenzler as Charles Holburn, a U.S. senator, friend of the Underwoods and husband of Felicity Holburn.
- Francie Swift as Felicity Holburn, a friend of the Underwoods and wife of Charles Holburn.
- Chance Kelly as Steve, a bodyguard and driver for Frank Underwood.
- Al Sapienza as Marty Spinella, the Head Lobbyist for the associated teacher's unions.
- Kathleen Chalfant as Margaret Tilden, the owner of Washington Herald.
- Chuck Cooper as Barney Hull, chief of the Metropolitan Police Department of the District of Columbia (MPDC).
- Wass Stevens as Paul Capra, a senior union official in South Philadelphia and a friend of Peter Russo's.
- Gerald McRaney as Raymond Tusk, a billionaire entrepreneur with holdings in the field of nuclear energy.
- Reed Birney as Donald Blythe, a respected and long-serving Representative from New Hampshire who has many years experience on education.
- Kevin Kilner as Michael Kern, a Senator from Colorado and candidate for the post of Secretary of State.
- Maryann Plunkett as Evelyn Baxter, business associate of Claire Underwood and a former office manager at the Clean Water Initiative.
- Michael Siberry as David Rasmussen, the House Majority Leader.
- Kenneth Tigar as Walter Doyle, an associate of Frank Underwood's.
- David Andrews as Tim Corbett, a former friend of Frank Underwood who owns a rafting company.
- Phyllis Somerville as Mrs. Russo, Peter Russo's mother.
- Michael Warner as Oliver Spence, Claire Underwood's attorney.

== Episodes ==
No. overall	No. in season	Title	Directed by	Written by	Original release date	Prod. code
1	1	"Chapter 1"	David Fincher	Beau Willimon	February 1, 2013	HOC-101
Democratic congressman Francis "Frank" Underwood is the House Majority Whip. Frank helped ensure the 2012 election of President Garrett Walker, who promised to appoint him as Secretary of State. However, Walker later chooses to instead nominate Senator Michael Kern. Chief of Staff Linda Vasquez informs Frank that their administration needs him within the House of Representatives, initially working on an education reform bill with Rep. Donald Blythe. Furious at Walker's betrayal, Frank and his wife, environmental activist Claire, decide to destroy Walker. When Rep. Peter Russo is arrested for driving drunk with prostitute Rachel Posner, Frank offers him a reprieve in exchange for his loyalty, covering up the incident by bribing the police commissioner. Frank also encounters Zoe Barnes, a young political reporter for the Washington Herald newspaper. The two come to an agreement: Frank will leak inside information to incriminate his opponents, while Zoe advances her career by publishing it. Frank leaks a copy of the first draft of Blythe's education bill, which proposes massive increases in government control of education, causing a scandal the first day after Walker's inauguration.
2	2	"Chapter 2"	David Fincher	Beau Willimon	February 1, 2013	HOC-102
In the aftermath of the leak of the education bill, Frank secures full control of the legislative course from the President and promptly removes Blythe, who graciously takes the fall for the controversy. Frank hires a team of young congressional staffers to write a draft of the bill in a week (a process which would usually take months). Claire decides to lay off more than half of the staff at her environmental non-profit, the Clean Water Initiative (CWI), in order to proceed with a costly international expansion despite losing a major donation which had been contingent on Frank becoming Secretary of State. Frank plants a story with Zoe loosely tying Kern to an anti-Israeli editorial column that ran in his college newspaper while Kern was editor. Kern mishandles the resulting media scrutiny. Frank forcefully arranges for Russo to meet conspiracy theorist Roy Kapeniak, who wrote for the column in question, and convince him to go on the record and state that Kern himself wrote the article, destroying Kern's confirmation chances. Frank then tosses Catherine Durant's name to Zoe as a likely replacement before reinforcing her credentials with Linda.
3	3	"Chapter 3"	James Foley	Keith Huff and Beau Willimon	February 1, 2013	HOC-103
In the midst of negotiating the education reforms with the teachers' unions, Frank must visit his hometown of Gaffney, South Carolina, when his main local opponent stirs trouble. A young woman has been killed in a car accident after texting while driving, apparently distracted by the peach-shaped water tower which Frank had advocated to keep standing. His rival encourages the parents to sue, forcing Frank into a difficult negotiation. Claire meets and hires a hesitant Gillian Cole, another environmental activist, to employ her international expertise. Russo makes an effort to clean up his life in order to maintain his relationship with his girlfriend, Christina Gallagher, who is also his chief of staff. Zoe gets into trouble for talking on national television about the Herald and her editor, Tom Hammerschmidt, after being told not to.
4	4	"Chapter 4"	James Foley	Rick Cleveland and Beau Willimon	February 1, 2013	HOC-104
Frank resorts to intricate string-pulling when House Speaker Bob Birch refuses to support the education bill with its controversial amendments, organizing a coup against Birch using House Majority Leader David Rasmussen in order to pressure Birch to cooperate. He ensures Rep. Terry Womack's support for the coup by forcing Russo to allow a shipyard in his district to close in order to keep a military base in Womack's district open. Birch relents and Womack replaces Rasmussen as majority leader. Meanwhile, Tom is exasperated with Zoe's rebelliousness but the Herald's publisher supports her. Tom offers Zoe the position of White House correspondent and she indicates acceptance, but Frank convinces her to decline it, which further antagonizes Tom. Remy Danton, a lobbyist and former employee of Frank's, offers Claire double the donation previously promised to CWI, which would allow them to hire back the staff they laid off. However, Frank pressures Claire to refuse it, suspicious of Remy's motives. Claire meets with photographer Adam Galloway, a former lover who tries to rekindle their relationship. Zoe invites Frank to her apartment for an intimate encounter.
5	5	"Chapter 5"	Joel Schumacher	Sarah Treem	February 1, 2013	HOC-105
Claire is aware that Frank is having sexual relations with Zoe, but goes along with it as long as it achieves their goals — this, however, rejuvenates her interest in Adam. The changes to the education bill lead to an irate meeting between Frank and Marty Spinella, the lobbyist for the teachers' union, who vows to fight back. The fallout from being forced to allow the shipyard to close and breaking up with Christina sends Russo into a depression, causing an inebriated Russo to confront Frank at his home. Frank forcefully berates Russo's drinking and immaturity, then confides that he has set the stage for Russo to run for governor of Pennsylvania if he can clean up his act. Tom fires Zoe and is in turn forced to resign for profanely insulting and firing her. Frank and Claire foil Spinella's televised attempt to disrupt their fundraising event with a charm offensive. In retaliation, Spinella initiates a nationwide teachers' strike.
6	6	"Chapter 6"	Joel Schumacher	Sam Forman	February 1, 2013	HOC-106
As the teachers' union strike persists, President Walker instructs Frank to water down the bill. Frank decides he has to achieve total victory over Spinella or he will lose all of his influence with the President. A brick thrown through a window of Frank's home allows him to target Spinella, and the pair debate on CNN with Frank performing poorly. Frank barely manages to keep Walker from forcing him to abandon the bill. A cleaned-up Russo informs Frank that he will accept Frank's help and run for governor. Frank sets the wheels in motion by enlisting Claire's help to draft an environmental bill that will help CWI and also replace some of the jobs lost with the shipyard closure. Monitoring the police radio, Frank uses a local shooting to force Spinella to the Capitol, provokes Spinella into a rage (by revealing that Frank organized the brick incident himself) resulting in Spinella punching him in the face. Frank advises Spinella to end the strike immediately or else face felony charges.
7	7	"Chapter 7"	Charles McDougall	Kate Barnow and Beau Willimon	February 1, 2013	HOC-107
Walker signs the education bill into law, earning Frank a major victory and affording him influence and favor. Vice President Jim Matthews feels sidelined and expresses discontent with Walker. Russo readies himself for the governor's race by attending Alcoholics Anonymous meetings. Using Zoe, Frank generates some positive spin on the announcement. He meets with Christina and requests she reconcile with Russo and become his deputy campaign manager, reigniting her personal relationship with Russo. Meanwhile, Rachel Posner attempts to blackmail Frank's chief of staff, Doug Stamper, for financial assistance. In preparation for his nomination, Russo is intensively grilled by one of Frank's team about his past misbehavior, making him very uneasy. Like Russo, Doug is revealed to be attending AA meetings regularly. Zoe recommends Janine Skorsky for a job at the news website Slugline.
8	8	"Chapter 8"	Charles McDougall	Beau Willimon	February 1, 2013	HOC-108
Frank visits his alma mater, a military college, which is honoring him by putting his name on a new library. He spends the night reminiscing and drinking with old buddies, including one who is implied to be his former lover. Remy has concerns about Russo running for governor. Russo visits Philadelphia and tries to convince the former shipyard employees to support him. An angry meeting with them reveals an uphill struggle ahead, but he perseveres.
9	9	"Chapter 9"	James Foley	Beau Willimon and Rick Cleveland	February 1, 2013	HOC-109
Russo goes on a bus tour around Pennsylvania with Vice President Matthews for support. Matthews initially thwarts Russo's campaign but Russo eventually wins his respect. Frank tries to whip support in Congress for the environmental bill. Walker requests Linda to assist him, but Frank instructs her to instead attend to her son's college admission issue in which he is being refused entry. Frank requests Claire to present a justification for the large financial commitment, but she causes the bill to fail in exchange for assistance for CWI from Remy. Zoe decides to terminate her sexual relationship with Frank but changes her mind when he withdraws the professional aspect as well.
10	10	"Chapter 10"	Carl Franklin	Sarah Treem	February 1, 2013	HOC-110
Frank is furious with Claire for engineering the environment bill's failure. Claire visits Zoe and informs her that she knows about Frank's affair. She then spends some time with Adam in New York, to Frank's consternation. With the environment bill defeated, Russo demands an alternative and threatens to reveal the conspiracy that brought down Senator Kern. Frank in turn decides to destroy Russo; Stamper enlists Rachel to pick up Russo at a fundraiser and get him drunk. An inebriated Russo makes a mess of a live radio interview, destroying his candidacy. Frank does a favor for Linda by having Gillian Cole recommend her son's college admission. Zoe approaches her former colleague Lucas Goodwin for intimacy.
11	11	"Chapter 11"	Carl Franklin	Keith Huff and Kate Barnow and Beau Willimon	February 1, 2013	HOC-111
Frank convinces Vice President Matthews to give up his office and run for governor of Pennsylvania in Russo's place. Linda asks Frank candidly if his ambition is to become Vice President himself; he admits it and reaches out to her as an ally. After attempting to reconnect with his children, a still-drunk Russo hands himself in to the police for the previous DUI for which he was not charged. Frank picks him up from jail and, recognizing Russo to be too great a liability, kills Russo in his car by carbon monoxide poisoning, making it look like suicide.
12	12	"Chapter 12"	Allen Coulter	Gina Gionfriddo and Beau Willimon	February 1, 2013	HOC-112
With Matthews about to win the governor's race, Frank is helping the White House vet candidates to replace him. Walker sends him to evaluate Raymond Tusk, a billionaire who lives modestly in St. Louis. Frank discovers deeper connections between Walker and Tusk, and realizes that it is actually Tusk who is vetting him. Tusk offers to recommend Frank in return for an unspecified favor but Frank refuses. Gillian obstructs SanCorp's media presence at CWI's establishment in Botswana, resulting in Claire firing her. Janine investigates the Philadelphia shipyard closure in connection with Russo's apparent suicide and enlists Zoe's help with the political aspect.
13	13	"Chapter 13"	Allen Coulter	Beau Willimon	February 1, 2013	HOC-113
Frank attempts to leverage Tusk by requesting Remy to compromise Tusk's nuclear industry assets, but Tusk purchases enough of SanCorp's stock to defuse any threat. Tusk again attempts to secure Frank's loyalty in relation to international trade tariffs, particularly Chinese-controlled raw materials for his nuclear reactors. Frank wins his respect by offering only to work pragmatically with future developments. Walker offers Frank the vice presidency, and he accepts. Gillian initiates a wrongful termination lawsuit against Claire. Claire ponders with Frank the point of their plans, and then consults a doctor about possible fertility treatment. Zoe, Janine and Lucas uncover Russo's uncharged DUI, Rachel's identity and Stamper's involvement.

== Reception ==
=== Critical response ===
The first season received positive reviews from critics. On Metacritic, the season received a weighted mean score of 76 out of 100 based on 25 reviews, which translates to "generally positive reception." On Rotten Tomatoes, the season received a score of 87% with an average rating of 8.1 out of 10 based on 47 reviews; the site's consensus reads, "Bolstered by strong performances — especially from Kevin Spacey — and surehanded direction, House of Cards is a slick, engrossing drama that may redefine how television is produced." USA Today critic Robert Bianco praised the series, particularly Spacey and Wright's lead performances, stating "If you think network executives are nervous, imagine the actors who have to go up against that pair in the Emmys." Tom Gilatto of People Weekly lauded the first two episodes, calling them "cinematically rich, full of sleek, oily pools of darkness." In her review for The Denver Post, Joanne Ostrow said the series is "Deeply cynical about human beings as well as politics and almost gleeful in its portrayal of limitless ambition." She added: "House of Cards is a wonderfully sour take on power and corruption."

=== Awards ===
On July 18, 2013, House of Cards became the first Primetime Emmy Award nominated series for original online only web television for the 65th Primetime Emmy Awards. Among those nine nominations were Outstanding Drama Series, Outstanding Lead Actor in a Drama Series for Kevin Spacey, Outstanding Lead Actress in a Drama Series for Robin Wright, and Outstanding Directing for a Drama Series for David Fincher. The first season was also nominated for Casting, Cinematography, Editing, Music, and Main Title Music at the 65th Primetime Creative Arts Emmy Awards. On September 15, the series became the first web television series and the first web television webisode to be Primetime Emmy Awarded with two wins at the 65th Primetime Creative Arts Emmy Awards: Eigil Bryld for Outstanding Cinematography for a Single-Camera Series and Laray Mayfield and Julie Schubert for Outstanding Casting for a Drama Series. On September 22, Netflix made history with a total three wins including Fincher's Outstanding Directing for a Drama Series for directing the pilot episode "Chapter 1" in addition to the pair of Creative Arts Emmy Awards, making "Chapter 1" the first Primetime Emmy-awarded webisode. None of the Emmy awards were considered to be in major categories, however.

Spacey received best actor nominations at the 20th Screen Actors Guild Awards, 71st Golden Globe Awards, and 18th Satellite Awards. Wright won best actress at both the 71st Golden Globe Awards and 18th Satellite Awards, while Stoll was nominated at both for supporting actor and the series was nominated at both for best drama. Wright's Golden Globe Award for Best Actress – Television Series Drama for her portrayal of Claire Underwood made her the first actress to win a Golden Globe Award for an online-only web television series. The show won a 2013 Peabody Award for Area of Excellence.

At the 3rd Critics' Choice Television Awards, Kevin Spacey and Corey Stoll were nominated for Best Drama Actor and Best Drama Supporting Actor, respectively. The show has also been nominated at the 29th TCA Awards for the Outstanding New Program and the Program of the Year. The show was also nominated at the 40th People's Choice Awards for Favorite Streaming Series, at the Producers Guild of America Awards 2013 for Outstanding Producer of Episodic Television, Drama, at the 66th Directors Guild of America Awards for Outstanding Directing – Drama Series, at the Writers Guild of America Awards 2013 for Television: Dramatic Series, Television: New Series and Television: Episodic Drama, winning new series.

In addition, the success of House of Cards and popularity of Breaking Bad, both of which are only available in the United Kingdom online has caused a rule change for the British Academy Television Awards and British Academy Television Craft Awards beginning with the ceremonies for the 2013 calendar year on May 18, 2014, and April 27, 2014, respectively. At the 2014 British Academy Television Awards the show was nominated for Best International Programme.

== Home media ==
The first season was released on DVD and Blu-ray in region 1 on June 11, 2013, in region 2 on June 10, 2013, and in region 4 on June 27, 2013.

Director's commentaries for all of the first-season episodes premiered on Netflix on January 3, 2014. They had not been included on the home video release.

== See also ==
- Propaganda model — Throughout the season, Underwood is portrayed utilizing his close relationship with the press to ascertain power. The Chomsky-Herman model proposes a theory explaining systemic and pro-establishment undemocratic bias in media.
