= Chapter 3 (House of Cards) =

- House of Cards episode
- Episode no.: Season 1 Episode 3
- Directed by: James Foley
- Written by: Keith Huff; Beau Willimon
- Cinematography by: Eigil Bryld
- Editing by: Sidney Wolinsky
- Production code: HOC-103
- Original release date: February 1, 2013
- Running time: 52 minutes

Episode chronology
← Previous "Chapter 2"	Next → "Chapter 4"
- House of Cards (season 1)

"Chapter 3" is the third episode of the first season of the American political thriller drama series House of Cards. Written by Keith Huff and series creator Beau Willimon, and directed by James Foley, the episode premiered on February 1, 2013, when it was released along with the rest of the first season on the American streaming service Netflix.

== Plot ==
Frank (Kevin Spacey) is in the middle of negotiating the education bill with Marty Spinella (Al Sapienza), head of a teachers' union, when he learns that a 17-year-old girl has been killed due to texting while driving in his hometown of Gaffney, South Carolina, while being distracted by the Peachoid, a water tower shaped like a peach that Frank had advocated to keep standing. County administrator Oren Chase (Murphy Guyer), a Republican rival of Frank's who wants his congressional seat, urges the girl's parents to file a lawsuit against him.

Over Linda (Sakina Jaffrey) and Spinella's protests, Frank leaves for Gaffney. There, he meets the girl's parents and delivers a eulogy at her funeral, offering a settlement of $150,000 and promising to sponsor billboards warning against texting while driving. When the parents don't seem satisfied, he asks Reverend Jenkins (Bill Phillips) to arrange the following morning's service to give him the pulpit. Meanwhile, Claire (Robin Wright) tries to recruit Gillian Cole (Sandrine Holt), the head of a competing environmental nonprofit, but is refused. Unfazed, Claire follows Gillian home and, noting that she can't afford treatment for her chronic illness, promises her health insurance.

Zoe (Kate Mara) makes numerous media appearances as a result of her leak of Durant's (Jayne Atkinson) nomination for Secretary of State. Her off-the-cuff comments during interviews lead to a rift with Hammerschmidt (Boris McGiver), who suspends her for a month. Meanwhile, Russo (Corey Stoll) starts making efforts to put his life back in order to maintain his relationship with Christina (Kristen Connolly), who is considering taking a job with House Speaker Bob Birch. He gets rid of his drug stash and tells Christina that he doesn't want her to leave.

In South Carolina, Frank continues negotiating the education bill via conference call. After a brief phone conversation with Claire, he corresponds with Zoe via text and she sends him mildly flirty messages. The next morning, Underwood speaks to the congregation of his hometown church and gives a passionate old-school sermon around the "idea of hate". He's then able to connect to the parishioners by making them equals, saying they've all done this before when feeling soul-crushing loss, and two among them are feeling that today.

Frank invites the parents to lunch. Discussions get heated with Underwood asking them if they want him to resign. He ends up on good terms with them, announcing a Furman University scholarship in their daughter's honor. In order to take Oren down, he finds out that the responsibility for guardrails is the county's—but none have been built. Along with the mayor, Frank visits Oren and confronts him with that responsibility. He also tells Oren that the planned power lines that the mayor has blocked, because they would fall on Oren's property, can go up this year if he claims it as eminent domain.

== Cast ==
Following is the list of billed cast.

=== Main ===
- Kevin Spacey as U.S. Representative Francis J. Underwood
- Robin Wright as Claire Underwood, Francis' wife
- Kate Mara as Zoe Barnes, reporter at The Washington Herald
- Corey Stoll as U.S. Representative Peter Russo
- Michael Kelly as Doug Stamper, Underwood's Chief of Staff
- Sakina Jaffrey as Linda Vasquez, White House Chief of Staff
- Kristen Connolly as Christina Gallagher, a congressional staffer
- Sandrine Holt as Gillian Cole, an employee at CWI
- Boris McGiver as Tom Hammerschmidt, editor-in-chief for The Washington Herald

=== Recurring ===
- Elizabeth Norment as Nancy Kaufberger
- Rachel Brosnahan as Rachel Posner
- Nathan Darrow as Edward Meechum
- Al Sapienza as Martin Spinella
- Kathleen Chalfant as Margaret Tilden
- Soledad O'Brien as herself
- Murphy Guyer as Oren Chase
- Clark Carmichael as Dean Masters
- Angela Christian as Leanne Masters

=== Guests ===
- Bill Phillips as Reverend Jenkins

== Reception ==
The episode received positive reviews from critics. Ryan McGee of The A.V. Club said, "the episode traversed in those soon-to-be-forgotten tales, even if the impact of them will be felt for the rest of this series."

== Notes ==
- This article incorporates material derived from the "Chapter 3" article on the House of Cards wiki at Fandom (formerly Wikia) and is licensed under the Creative Commons Attribution-Share Alike 3.0 License (5 September 2016).
