= List of House of Cards (American TV series) characters =

House of Cards is an American political drama web television series created by Beau Willimon for Netflix. It is an adaptation of the BBC's miniseries of the same name and is based on the 1989 novel by Michael Dobbs. Below is a list consisting of the many characters who have appeared throughout the series' seasons. The only two actors to have main appearances in all six seasons of House of Cards are Robin Wright and Michael Kelly.

== Main cast overview ==
Character	Portrayed by	Seasons					
Character	Portrayed by	1	2	3	4	5	6
Francis "Frank" J. Underwood	Kevin Spacey	Starring	Starring	Starring	Starring	Starring	Audio
Claire Hale Underwood	Robin Wright	Starring	Starring	Starring	Starring	Starring	Starring
Zoe Barnes	Kate Mara	Starring	Guest		Guest	Photo	
Peter Russo	Corey Stoll	Starring			Guest		
Doug Stamper	Michael Kelly	Starring	Starring	Starring	Starring	Starring	Starring
Christina Gallagher	Kristen Connolly	Starring	Recurring				
Linda Vasquez	Sakina Jaffrey	Starring	Starring				Guest
Gillian Cole	Sandrine Holt	Starring	Guest				
Janine Skorsky	Constance Zimmer	Starring	Recurring		Guest		Starring
Garrett Walker	Michel Gill	Starring	Starring		Recurring	Recurring	
Lucas Goodwin	Sebastian Arcelus	Starring	Starring		Starring	Photo	
Remy Danton	Mahershala Ali	Starring	Starring	Starring	Starring	Photo	
Tom Hammerschmidt	Boris McGiver	Starring	Recurring		Starring	Starring	Starring
Edward Meechum	Nathan Darrow	Starring	Starring	Starring	Recurring		
Rachel Posner	Rachel Brosnahan	Starring	Starring	Recurring		Photo	
Raymond Tusk	Gerald McRaney	Recurring	Starring		Recurring	Guest	
Cathy Durant	Jayne Atkinson	Recurring	Starring	Starring	Starring	Starring	Recurring
Jackie Sharp	Molly Parker		Starring	Starring	Starring	Photo	
Gavin Orsay	Jimmi Simpson		Starring	Starring			
Ayla Sayyad	Mozhan Marnò		Starring	Recurring			
Seth Grayson	Derek Cecil		Recurring	Starring	Starring	Starring	Starring
Heather Dunbar	Elizabeth Marvel		Recurring	Starring	Starring		
Thomas Yates	Paul Sparks			Starring	Starring	Starring	
Viktor Petrov	Lars Mikkelsen			Starring	Recurring	Recurring	Starring
Kate Baldwin	Kim Dickens			Starring	Guest	Guest	
LeAnn Harvey	Neve Campbell				Starring	Starring	
Will Conway	Joel Kinnaman				Starring	Starring	
Mark Usher	Campbell Scott					Starring	Starring
Jane Davis	Patricia Clarkson					Starring	Starring
Hannah Conway	Dominique McElligott				Recurring	Starring	
Aidan Macallan	Damian Young				Recurring	Starring	
Annette Shepherd	Diane Lane						Starring
Bill Shepherd	Greg Kinnear						Starring
Duncan Shepherd	Cody Fern						Starring

== Main characters ==
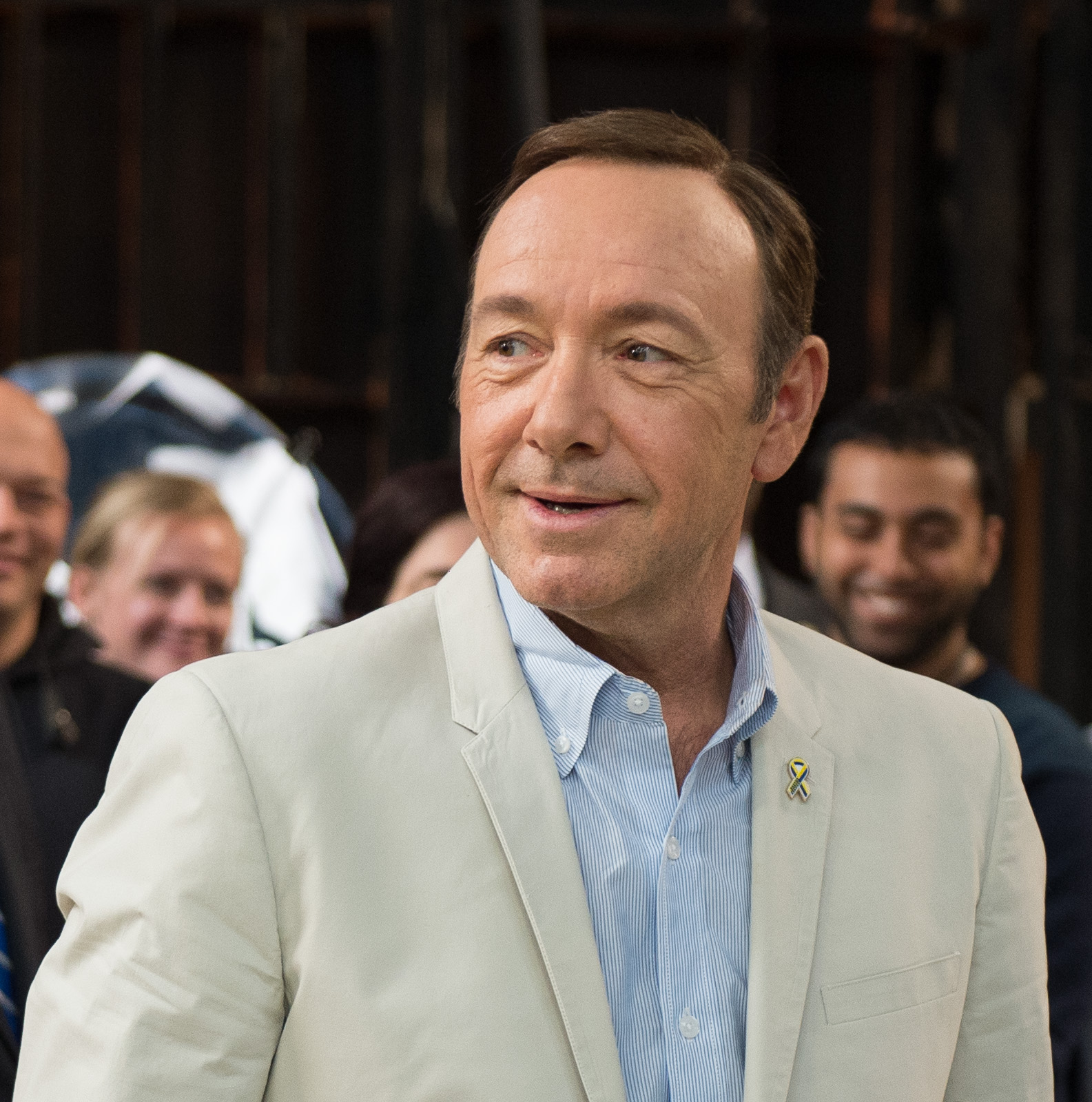
Kevin Spacey

- Francis J. Underwood (Kevin Spacey) is a Democrat from South Carolina's 5th Congressional District that is House Majority Whip in season one, Vice President of the United States in season two, and the 46th President of the United States in seasons three and four. An utterly ruthless and conniving politician, he pursues only his own political agenda and manipulates everyone around him to grab influence and prestige, at the potential cost of destroying everyone else to push himself forward. His name is derived from Francis Urquhart, the protagonist of the BBC version and the novel version of House of Cards, and Oscar Underwood, the first Democratic House whip. Just as Urquhart does in the BBC version, Underwood often breaks the fourth wall by speaking directly to the viewer.

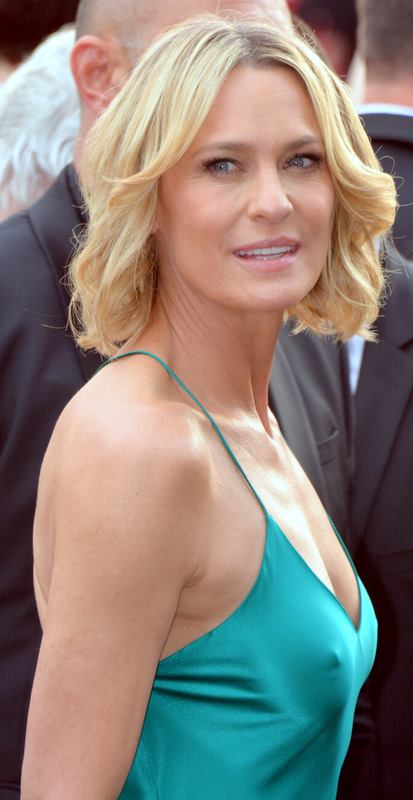
Robin Wright

- Claire Underwood (Robin Wright) is Francis's wife who administrates the non-governmental organization Clean Water Initiative in season one before giving it up to become Second Lady of the United States. She often abets Frank's political scheming, and proves to be just as cold, manipulative, and power-hungry as her husband. In season three, she becomes First Lady of the United States and the United States Ambassador to the United Nations. In season five, she becomes the 47th President of the United States. Her equivalent character from the original series is Elizabeth Urquhart.
- Zoe Barnes (Kate Mara) was a reporter for the fictitious The Washington Herald who forms a correspondence with Underwood. She was extremely ambitious and after an encounter with Frank Underwood she approached him at his home with a proposal. The two formed an arrangement to use each other to advance their respective careers: Underwood uses her to leak stories when he wants that will damage his opponents, while Barnes uses him to get bigger and better stories. She formed a personal relationship with him that became sexual, often complicated by their mutual struggle for power and services from each other. Barnes later moved to the more web-based Slugline. Later, she became increasingly suspicious of Underwood's involvement with Peter Russo. Working with her past Herald coworkers Janine Skorsky and Lucas Goodwin (with whom she begins a relationship), she investigated what she soon suspected to be murder. During the season two premiere, her investigation led to her death, with Underwood pushing her in front of a Washington Metro train to protect his own secrets. In season 4, Zoe, along with Peter Russo, appear in a dream Frank has after an assassination attempt on his life. Her equivalent from the original series is Mattie Storin.
- Peter Russo (Corey Stoll) was a Democratic Congressman from Pennsylvania's 1st Congressional District. Divorced with two children, he was in an intimate relationship with Christina Gallagher, a member of his staff. Russo was blackmailed into serving Underwood after Underwood "fixed" his arrest for DUI with a prostitute (Rachel Posner) in his car and then holds it over Russo's head. With Underwood's help, he got sober and ran for Governor of Pennsylvania. However, Underwood eventually contrived to have him relapse in his alcoholism right before an important interview, ruin his career, and then get him to withdraw gracefully as a way of manipulating Vice President Jim Matthews into running for Governor and securing the vice presidency for Frank. However, when Frank saw that Peter was becoming a liability, he killed him and made his death look like a suicide. In season 4, Peter, along with Zoe Barnes, appear in a dream Frank has after a failed assassination attempt on his life. Whereas most characters who were adapted from the UK version of House of Cards were based primarily on a single character, Russo's storyline takes reference from two characters: Mr. Stoat, an MP whose career Francis Urquhart saves after he is caught with a prostitute, and Roger O'Neill, the Conservative Party's cocaine-addicted press secretary, whom Urquhart murders by putting rat poison in his cocaine.
- Douglas "Doug" Stamper (Michael Kelly) is Underwood's unwaveringly loyal chief of staff and confidant. He is instrumental in strategizing and carrying out many of Frank's plans. A recovering alcoholic, Stamper prizes discipline and self-control above all else, but loses his poise when he comes into contact with Rachel Posner, whom he helps Underwood use as part of his plot to bring down Peter Russo. He relocates her in order to keep her involvement in Russo's death hidden. He is one of the few who knows the truth about Frank's involvement in Russo's death. In Season 2 he feels threatened by the influence of Seth Grayson, The Underwoods' new Press Secretary. He begins to control Rachel's life and becomes increasingly infatuated with her. The end of the second season finds Stamper presumably dead in the woods, Rachel having bashed him repeatedly in the head with a brick. It can be assumed that Stamper was planning to murder Rachel, concerned that she would speak up about her role in Underwood's murder of Peter Russo. At the start of the third season, it is revealed that Stamper survived the attack. He undergoes physical therapy to regain his ability to walk, and becomes obsessed with tracking down Rachel, who has gone into hiding, and works with Gavin Orsay to do so. Devastated when Underwood insists that he take time to recover rather than continuing his work, Stamper relapses in his alcoholism after fifteen years of sobriety. After tracking down and killing Rachel, he returns to his chief of staff position. Doug continues to serve Frank as his chief of staff. Season 4 saw Doug struggling to keep things in control during both Frank and Claire's separation and finding out of Seth's betrayal that nearly results in Doug killing Seth. When Frank is shot, Doug offers his liver to the President but cannot donate due to his alcoholic history. After forcing a dying patient to die in order for a wounded Frank to be bumped in the donation list to get the liver, he begins to have spells of guilt. His guilt leads him to donate a large sum of money to his family and he begins seeing the deceased man's wife. Doug continues as Frank's Chief of Staff, as a part of Frank's plan that leads to his resignation from the presidency. Doug is a mole that releases classified information to the Washington Herald, posing as Catherine Durant. Later, Doug takes a fall for Frank and takes the blame for the murder of Zoe Barnes. After having a conflict with Claire Underwood, he officially handed in his resignation to Frank before he resigned the presidency. With Frank Underwood dead and Claire Underwood serving as president, Doug recants his admission of guilt in Zoe Barnes' murder. Lacking evidence to use against him, the DOJ allows for his release from a psychiatric facility. The deal was struck when he threatened to use testimony from him and Catherine Durant to derail Claire's presidency. Doug gets a new job as political operative for a young congressman from Illinois who hopes to become Speaker of the House. But his real goal is to secure Frank's legacy from Claire, who is determined to erase it. During a tense confrontation in the Oval Office, Doug confesses to Claire that he was Frank's murderer. Doug murdered him when Frank went to the White House to kill Claire, who had refused to pardon him. Knowing that this would forever tarnish Frank's legacy, which took years of careful planning and strategy, Doug sabotaged his liver medication to induce an overdose. Doug then angrily pleads for Claire to admit that her success is because of Frank. Claire refuses, and Doug threatens her with the letter opener that Frank let him take from the Oval prior to his resignation. Once free of his grip, Claire takes the letter opener and stabs Doug in the torso. She then comforts him as he slowly bleeds to death on the Oval Office floor. His counterpart from the original series is Tim Stamper.
- Christina Gallagher (Kristen Connolly) is the former chief of staff to Representative Peter Russo and deputy chief of staff to President Garrett Walker, as well as Russo's former love interest.
- Linda Vasquez (Sakina Jaffrey) is the former Chief of Staff to President Walker. While she got her position in the White House with Underwood's help and works with Frank as much as she can, she also sees into his duplicity more than others. After Frank helps get her son into college she pays him back by helping him become Vice President. In season 2, she and Frank become more adversarial, fighting over who will be the most influential voice in President Walker's ear. After realizing Frank has won, she hands her formal resignation to President Walker. After her surrender, Frank notes that he has an extremely high level of respect for Vasquez.
- Gillian Cole (Sandrine Holt) is the leader of a grass-roots organization called World Well that provides clean water to developing countries. Through the Clean Water Initiative, she grapples with Frank and Claire's interests. Claire eventually gave up on Clear Water and gave the company to Gillian so she could administrate.
- Janine Skorsky (Constance Zimmer) is a former journalist, and was the former White House Correspondent for The Washington Herald before her position was offered to Zoe Barnes. Her former colleague Lucas Goodwin asked for her help to expose Underwood for murdering Zoe and Peter Russo, but denied for the sake of her life. In the final season, Janine is still working for a small weekly paper in Ithaca, New York. She and Doug collaborate on a series of exclusives involving Frank’s “audio diary” (all those breaking-the-fourth-wall talks Frank used to have with the audience) that threatens to expose the real Claire to the world.
- Garrett Walker (Michel Gill) is the 45th President of the United States, former Governor of Colorado. He trusts Underwood as a close adviser and lieutenant, but remains blind to his machinations. Walker promised Underwood for the Secretary of State position for his help getting Walker elected, and his snub of Frank once he takes office sets the plot of the series into motion. Through Underwood's actions Walker's Vice President steps down. While Underwood vies for the position Walker says he in considering billionaire Raymond Tusk, but he is actually using Tusk to vet Underwood. It is then discovered that Walker and Tusk are longtime friends, and that Tusk has great influence over Walker. After Tusk's money laundering is revealed a false gesture of loyalty from Frank makes Walker decide not to pardon Tusk. In response Tusk implicates Walker in the scandal. With the public believing he is guilty and facing impeachment he resigns in disgrace. He ultimately remains unaware of Frank's treachery.
- Lucas Goodwin (Sebastian Arcelus) was a journalist at The Washington Herald. He had feelings for Zoe Barnes, one of his co-workers. But as they were starting to grow a relationship, she is killed by Frank Underwood. He believes it was him but no one else really does. He goes on a spree to try to get evidence against him and he goes even across the legal line and is arrested for cyberterrorism. After he is freed he looks for help through Janine Skorsky and Tom Hammerschmidt, with the first denying her help. Tom also says no until Lucas attempts to kill Underwood and, in doing so, gets killed by Edward Meechum. Tom then picks off where he left off.
- Remy Danton (Mahershala Ali) is a lawyer for Glendon Hill and lobbyist who works for natural gas company SanCorp during the first season and for Raymond Tusk in the second. Prior, he worked eight years for Underwood as Press Secretary before leaving to pursue more money rather than Underwood's offer of power. He works together with Jackie Sharp during season two, and they begin a casual relationship that later becomes strained because of their business relationship. During the third season, he becomes Underwood's Chief of Staff, but eventually becomes disillusioned because of Underwood's treatment towards Sharp. He later decides to stop working in politics.
- Tom Hammerschmidt (Boris McGiver) is the former editor in chief of The Washington Herald. After Zoe Barnes declines his offer and continues to undermine his authority, he fires her, which infuriates Margaret Tilden, the creator of the Herald who forces him to resign. He is then approached by Lucas Goodwin to help him investigate Underwood, whom Goodwin strongly believes to be the murderer of Zoe and Peter Russo. At first, he doesn't believe Goodwin's accusations. But then, after seeing Goodwin's attempt to kill Underwood and in doing so getting killed by Edward Meechum, he investigates. He finds something tangible and gets sources from Underwood's former allies Jackie Sharp, Remy Danton, and Garrett Walker.
- Edward Meechum (Nathan Darrow) was a former Marine and Capitol police officer, who protected Frank while he was Majority Whip. He was fired from his bodyguard job early on. After getting him reinstated Frank required unconditional loyalty and asked him to be "a rock" who "absorbs nothing". Frank trusts Meechum with his life and has him promoted to the U.S. Secret Service through a specialized training program. Meechum drove Frank around and was often a silent presence in Frank's unethical meetings. His relationship with Frank, who refers to him nearly always as "Meechum" with an exception in only one episode, bordered on romantic, and it was insinuated that he, Claire and Frank were engaged in a polyamorous relationship. Doug does not share this same trust and refuses to treat Meechum with respect out of his own devotion to the president. He was killed early in season 4 when he is shot by Lucas Goodwin during an assassination attempt on Frank. Though mortally wounded, he managed to kill Goodwin before succumbing to his injuries. He was subsequently buried at Arlington National Cemetery.
- Rachel Posner (Rachel Brosnahan) was a prostitute whom Underwood and Stamper used to bring about Russo's downfall. She was initially with Russo when he was pulled over for drunk driving. Stamper paid her off to stay quiet about the Congressman and to cover up, then helps her get a job. Stamper has her proposition Russo and make him break sobriety. After Zoe Barnes begins to question Rachel's relation to Russo's suicide Stamper forces her to relocate. Stamper becomes obsessed with her and begins to control her life, forcing her to avoid contact with anyone to hide her connection to Underwood. Rachel begins attending church services and enters into a relationship with Lisa Williams, to Stamper's disapproval. Realizing he can no longer control her, Stamper drives Rachel into the woods, presumably to murder her. Rachel responds by bashing his head repeatedly with a rock and leaving him for dead. She flees to New Mexico and begins a new life under an assumed name. In season three, Stamper tracks her down and ultimately kills her in order to prove his allegiance to Francis, thus finally tying up the connection between Underwood and Russo. In the final episode, Doug left to journalist Janine Skorsky the coordinates to Rachel Posner’s buried body.
- Jacqueline "Jackie" Sharp (Molly Parker) is a Democratic congresswoman from California, U.S. Army veteran and the current Deputy Minority Whip tapped by Underwood to succeed him as Majority Whip when he is made vice president. While she claims to work for herself and not be beholden to others, she sees her position constantly tested through her ties to Frank, Claire, and Remy Danton. In season 2, Jackie is apprehensive about Claire Underwood's military sexual assault reform bill, concerned about civilian control over the military. In season 3, she runs for president against Frank Underwood and Heather Dunbar with the intention of dropping out and endorsing Underwood. However, after Underwood betrays her, she endorses Dunbar instead. Jackie is in a romantic relationship with Remy Danton but is married in season 3. She is based on Sarah Harding from the original series.
- Raymond Tusk (Gerald McRaney) is a billionaire businessman with a wide network of influence, although he prefers to live modestly. As a close friend of Walker's for over 20 years, he exerts heavy influence over Walker, and suggested snubbing Underwood for Secretary of State. He later agrees to form a partnership with Frank in exchange for supporting the latter's VP nomination, though this alliance quickly crumbles due to their clashing self interests and degenerates into political war. After Tusk's money laundering is revealed he is confident that Walker will pardon him. Walker does not and in response Tusk falsely implicates Walker in the scandal. In season three, it is revealed that Underwood pardoned Tusk. Tusk's character was influenced by billionaire investor Warren Buffett.
- Catherine "Cathy" Durant (Jayne Atkinson) is a Democratic Senator from Louisiana who becomes Secretary of State after Frank brings about the downfall of the previous nominee Michael Kern.
- Gavin Orsay (Jimmi Simpson) is a computer hacker, formerly working for the FBI and enlisted to entrap then-journalist Lucas Goodwin. Gavin used Agent Nathan Green's sting to gain access to the AT&T database, allowing him to extort both his handler and Doug Stamper.
- Ayla Sayyad (Mozhan Marnò) is a journalist working for the Wall Street Telegraph. After being forced out of the Press Corp by Seth Grayson, she does investigative journalism to uncover the links in the power triangle between President Walker, Vice-President Underwood and billionaire businessman Raymond Tusk. She was at the center of exposing the money laundering scandal involving Raymond Tusk, Xander Feng, and the White House.
- Heather Dunbar (Elizabeth Marvel) is an uncompromising lawyer from the family that owns the real-life Dunbar Armored Cars, Inc. and Solicitor General of the United States in the Walker Administration, who is appointed Special Prosecutor in the investigation into money laundering of foreign money via PACs. In season three, she resigns as solicitor general after seeing Underwood's manipulation and announces her candidacy for president, challenging Underwood in the Democratic primary. As a presidential candidate, Dunbar takes progressive positions on the issues and is a staunch opponent of Underwood's America Works program. She suspends her campaign in season four after controversy arises when word gets out that she had met with Lucas Goodwin prior to Goodwin's assassination attempt on Frank.
- Seth Grayson (Derek Cecil) is the White House Press Secretary. He works loyalty for Frank along with Remy, who was the chief of staff. After Remy exited, Grayson gave a list of things he would do if he were chief of staff. However, his position was jeopardized when Doug returned to work for Frank. In season four, after a photo of Frank's father side to side with a KKK member is revealed to the public and jeopardizes Frank's campaign, Doug discovers that Seth leaked the picture. Seth, in exchange of keeping his position in the White House, gives info on Heather and Lucas' meeting, which could link her to Frank's shooting and dismember her campaign. However, Seth visits Doug in his house and is almost suffocated to death by Doug, who wanted his loyalty and nothing more.
- Thomas "Tom" Yates (Paul Sparks) is a successful author whom Frank asks to write a book about the America Works jobs program (being chosen based on his review of Frank's new hobby, the game Monument Valley). The writing job leads to extended interview opportunities with Underwood and, later, Claire. As a result of this unusual level of access, Yates becomes nearly a friend and one of the primary speechwriters for the Underwood reelection campaign. Yates enters into a romantic relationship with Kate Baldwin, Wall Street Telegraph political reporter, and later in an affair with Claire.
- Kate Baldwin (Kim Dickens) is the chief political reporter of the Wall Street Telegraph who covered the White House after Sayyad was dismissed for protocol violations; she entered into a romantic relationship with Tom Yates.
- Viktor Petrov (Lars Mikkelsen) is the President of Russia who opposes Underwood's involvement in the Jordan Valley conflict and creates controversy when Russia passes anti-homosexual laws (which Petrov admits privately that he does not agree with) and is publicly opposed by members of the band Pussy Riot. Petrov's character shares several similarities with the real-life Russian president Vladimir Putin.
- LeAnn Harvey (Neve Campbell) was a Texas-based political consultant. Introduced in season four, she is very intelligent and successful at her job, highly praised for her ability to win campaigns. Leann forms a strong bond with Claire when she begins working for her. She later becomes the political campaign manager for Frank and Claire's election bid. Tension builds between Leann and Doug, who does not like the full access she receives to the president and first lady. She is eventually killed when her car is run off the road, at the orders of Frank.
- Will Conway (Joel Kinnaman) is a former governor of New York and was the Republican Party nominee for President of the United States in the 2016 election. Conway is married to Hannah and they have two kids, Charlie and Lilly. Their youth and strong values pose a threat to Frank Underwood, his opponent.
- Mark Usher (Campbell Scott) is a top-level political strategist and former campaign manager of Will Conway. A member of the Republican Party, Usher is serves as a special advisor to President Frank Underwood, and eventually as vice president to Claire.
- Jane Davis (Patricia Clarkson) is a Deputy Under Secretary of Commerce for International Trade.
- Hannah Conway (Dominique McElligott) is married to Republican Party nominee for President of the United States William Conway.
- Aidan Macallan (Damian Young) was a data scientist and NSA contractor who aided the Underwoods in staging a cyber attack which they hoped would swing the outcome of the 2016 Presidential election in their favor. Macallan eventually vanished and is later seen in Russia, collaborating with President Petrov, before being killed in his hotel room.
- Sean Jeffries (Korey Jackson) is a young reporter at The Washington Herald working under Hammerschmidt.
- General Ted Brockhart (Colm Feore) is a Republican Vice-Presidential nominee.
- Alex Romero (James Martinez) is a Congressman representing the 7th District of Arizona. Romero was a member of the Democratic Party, but is now an Independent. During the presidential campaigns, Romero worked with Will Conway. After Underwood was elected, Romero made certain demands for Underwood in exchange for his loyalty, with the President only serving one of them.
- Connor Ellis (Samuel Page) is the communications director for the Underwoods.

== Supporting characters ==
- Freddy Hayes (Reg E. Cathey) is the owner of Freddy's BBQ, an eatery frequented by Underwood, and one of Underwood's few true friends and confidants. Frank is forced to end his friendship with Freddy when Raymond Tusk exposes Freddy's criminal past as a gangbanger who served time in prison for the deaths of two people. This causes Freddy to lose out on a franchise opportunity; and he is then forced to sell his restaurant to bail out his son, after his son pulls a gun on a paparazzo photographer. In season 3, upon finding out that America Works sets Freddy up as a lowly dishwasher, Frank takes pity on him and gives him a job as a White House groundskeeper.
- Donald Blythe (Reed Birney) is a liberal Democrat of New Hampshire, a respected and long-serving Representative, and Underwood's foil in Congress. His wife has Alzheimer's disease. In the third season, Underwood selects Blythe as Vice President of the United States to get him out of the way in Congress. When Frank gets shot by Lucas Goodwin in an assassination attempt, the Twenty-Fifth Amendment is invoked, making him Acting President. He is incompetent in this role and relies primarily on Claire's advice on foreign policy matters.
- Bob Birch (Larry Pine) is the former Democratic Speaker of the House and current House Minority Leader.
- Terry Womack (played by Curtiss Cook) is a Democratic Congressman from Missouri's 5th congressional district, the House Minority Whip and former House Majority Leader, and the leader of the Black Caucus, who rises to the position thanks to Underwood.
- Adam Galloway (Ben Daniels) is a world-renowned photographer and occasional lover of Claire Underwood.
- Hector Mendoza (Benito Martinez) is a conservative Republican Senator from Arizona and the Senate Majority Leader. In season three, it is speculated that he will be a candidate for the Republican nomination for president. Despite promising Claire otherwise, he openly challenges her bid for U.S. Ambassador of the United Nations. He is later forced to resign off-screen after failing to have disclosed speech payments as income. He is a great admirer of Ronald Reagan.
- Jim Matthews (Dan Ziskie) is the former Vice President of the United States and former Governor of Pennsylvania.
- Margaret Tilden (Kathleen Chalfant) is the owner of The Washington Herald. She forces Tom Hammerschmidt to resign after he negatively affects the paper by insulting Zoe on tape and failing to prevent her from resigning. When Hammerschmidt starts piecing together stories of Frank's corruption, Hammerschmidt comes to her for support to write the story.
- Nancy Kaufberger (Elizabeth Norment) was Frank's loyal secretary.
- Marty Spinella (Al Sapienza) is the head lobbyist for the associated teacher's unions.
- Xander Feng (Terry Chen) is a corrupt Chinese businessman and backchannel diplomat who is Raymond Tusk's former business partner.
- Patricia "Tricia" Walker (Joanna Going) is Garrett Walker's wife and the former First Lady of the United States. She befriends Claire during season two, supporting her legislative moves, while also dealing with marital stress.
- Megan Hennessey (Libby Woodbridge) is a former U.S. Marine Private who was sexually assaulted by General Dalton McGinnis. As a result, she has post-traumatic stress disorder. When Megan sees a live interview in which Claire admits to being raped by McGinnis, she calls in to tell her story, resulting in McGinnis' downfall. Emboldened, Megan works with Claire and Tricia Walker on sexual assault reform in the U.S. military. However, after being confronted by Jackie Sharp during a live TV interview, her mental health deteriorates and she retreats from the public eye.
- Lisa Williams (Kate Lyn Sheil) is a social worker who starts a romantic relationship with Rachel. Stamper wanted to control Rachel and made her end the relationship. Lisa is later approached by Orsay, who is desperate to find Rachel's location and give to Stamper. Lisa, by now addicted to heroin, later appears in Hammerschmidt's office and tries to convince him that Rachel is dead, and that Stamper killed her. Hammerschmidt refuses to believe it, but Jeffries steals photo booth pictures she had made with Rachel. Hammerschmidt connects those photos to photos of Rachel from Zoe Barnes's files, and realizes Lisa is telling the truth.
- Gary Stamper (Kelly AuCoin) is Doug Stamper's older brother. Despite being somewhat estranged from his brother, Gary is fiercely loyal, and moves in with Doug when he is in recovery. He has two children, Franke and Clinton, who are played by Michael Kelly's real-life children.
- Doris Jones (Cicely Tyson) is a Texas congresswoman whose upcoming retirement might create a way for Claire Underwood to win a seat in the US House. (Claire decides not to run.)

== Cameo appearances ==
Real-life media figures who make cameo appearances as themselves include:

- Jim Acosta
- Donna Brazile
- Morley Safer
- Stephen Colbert
- George Stephanopoulos
- Dana Bash
- Major Garrett
- Van Jones
- Ashleigh Banfield
- Candy Crowley
- John King
- Soledad O'Brien
- Sean Hannity
- Dennis Miller
- Bill Maher
- Chris Hayes
- Rachel Maddow
- Chris Matthews
- Joe Scarborough
- Mika Brzezinski
- Wolf Blitzer
- Gretchen Carlson
- Charles Gibson
- Kasie Hunt
