= Chapter 6 (House of Cards) =

- House of Cards episode
- Episode no.: Season 1 Episode 6
- Directed by: Joel Schumacher
- Written by: Sam Forman
- Cinematography by: Eigil Bryld
- Editing by: Michelle Tesoro
- Production code: HOC-106
- Original release date: February 1, 2013
- Running time: 50 minutes

Episode chronology
← Previous "Chapter 5"	Next → "Chapter 7"
- House of Cards (season 1)

"Chapter 6" is the sixth episode of the first season of the American political thriller drama series House of Cards. Written by Sam Forman and directed by Joel Schumacher, the episode premiered on February 1, 2013, when it was released along with the rest of the first season on the American streaming service Netflix.

== Plot ==
After a month-long strike, Linda (Sakina Jaffery) tells Frank (Kevin Spacey) that President Walker (Michel Gill) will modify the education bill in order to appease the teachers' union. Frank, reluctant to concede to their demands, asks Linda to give him a week to end the strike without compromising the bill. After Claire (Robin Wright) invites their bodyguard Edward Meechum (Nathan Darrow) inside the house for a cup of coffee, a brick is thrown at the Underwoods' window. When Frank demands Meechum be fired for leaving his post, he pleads for mercy. Frank initially refuses, but eventually has Meechum reinstated.

Zoe (Kate Mara) receives a call from Frank, who wants her to write a story blaming Spinella (Al Sapienza), the head of the union, for the brick incident. Public opinion turns against Spinella, who tries to figure out a way to strike back. Meanwhile, with a newly-sober Russo (Corey Stoll) agreeing to run for governor of Pennsylvania, Frank tasks Claire with drafting a bill that will create jobs in Peter's district. Claire agrees in exchange for getting CWI's water filters through Sudanese customs, which Durant (Jayne Atkinson) has put a hold on. On Frank's instruction, Doug orchestrates a fake protest throwing foam bricks at Spinella, causing the striking teachers to retaliate with violence. In the wake of the public outcry, Spinella's media relations team suggests a televised debate against Frank, to which he reluctantly agrees.

Spinella performs better than expected during the debate, deflecting Frank's characterization that his union is violent and blaming Congress for failing the nation's children. Frank also embarrasses himself when he confuses his vowels, leading to widespread ridicule. Shortly afterwards, Frank persuades Democratic National Committee Chair Patricia Whittaker (Suzanne Savoy) to support Russo's gubernatorial campaign. Frank demands that Russo attend Alcoholics Anonymous meetings and assigns Doug as his sponsor. Claire comes up with a plan to develop 1,100 acres of land made available by the closing of the shipyard, creating thousands of jobs in Russo's district. Russo leaves a voicemail message for Christina (Kristen Connolly).

Walker, having lost confidence in Frank following the debate, orders him to gut the bill so that the strike will end. Frank argues that they must not concede to the union's demands. Surprised by Frank's defiance, Walker allows him to keep the bill intact. After hearing about a drive-by shooting, Frank instructs Zoe to tweet about the 8-year-old child killed in the crossfire, who had been home from school due to the strike. Spinella arrives at the Capitol, believing Frank is ready to negotiate. Instead, Frank hurls insults at Spinella and reveals that he staged the brick attack. Spinella is goaded into punching Frank, who threatens to press charges unless the strike is immediately put to an end.

Claire makes regular hospital visits for the Underwoods' former bodyguard, Steve, who is dying of pancreatic cancer. During one of these visits, Steve takes the opportunity to express his loathing for Frank and his fantasies of being with Claire. Claire defends Frank and declares that he is the only man who understood her. She then performs a handjob on Steve, embarrassing the man enough for him to ask her to stop. Later that night, she informs Frank of the visit, telling him that they are to pay for Steve's funeral when he dies.

== Cast ==
=== Main ===
- Kevin Spacey as U.S. Representative Francis J. Underwood
- Robin Wright as Claire Underwood, Francis' wife
- Kate Mara as Zoe Barnes, reporter at Slugline
- Michael Kelly as Doug Stamper, Underwood's Chief of Staff
- Sakina Jaffrey as Linda Vasquez, White House Chief of Staff
- Corey Stoll as U.S. Representative Peter Russo
- Kristen Connolly as Christina Gallagher, a congressional staffer
- Sandrine Holt as Gillian Cole, employee at CWI
- Ben Daniels as Adam Galloway, a New York-based photographer and Claire's love interest
- Boris McGiver as Tom Hammerschmidt, former editor-in-chief for The Washington Herald
- Michel Gill as United States President Garrett Walker

=== Recurring ===
- Elizabeth Norment as Nancy Kaufberger
- Nathan Darrow as Edward Meechum
- Reg E. Cathey as Freddy
- Al Sapienza as Martin Spinella
- Karl Kenzler as Charles Holburn
- Francie Swift as Felicity Holburn
- Larry Pine as Bob Birch
- Suzanne Savoy as Patricia Whittaker
- Tawny Cypress as Carly Heath
- Chance Kelly as Steve
- Curtiss Cook as Terry Womack

=== Guests ===
- Dennis Miller as himself
- Bill Maher as himself
- Candy Crowley as herself

== Reception ==
The episode received positive reviews from critics. In a lukewarm review, Ryan McGee of The A.V. Club said, "That's a problem with the show in general, which focuses as much on process as character development through this, the nearly halfway point in the first batch of episodes we're still calling a "season" of "television." Both need to simultaneously exist in order for House Of Cards to operate at maximum efficiency, but the show hasn't struck the balance effectively to date."

== Notes ==
- This article incorporates material derived from the "Chapter 6" article on the House of Cards wiki at Fandom (formerly Wikia) and is licensed under the Creative Commons Attribution-Share Alike 3.0 License (116 September 2016).
