= Chapter 4 (House of Cards) =

- House of Cards episode
- Episode no.: Season 1 Episode 4
- Directed by: James Foley
- Written by: Rick Cleveland; Beau Willimon
- Cinematography by: Eigil Bryld
- Editing by: Sidney Wolinsky
- Production code: HOC-104
- Original release date: February 1, 2013
- Running time: 52 minutes

Episode chronology
← Previous "Chapter 3"	Next → "Chapter 5"
- House of Cards (season 1)

"Chapter 4" is the fourth episode of the first season of the American political thriller drama series House of Cards. Written by Rick Cleveland and series creator Beau Willimon, and directed by James Foley, the episode premiered on February 1, 2013, when it was released along with the rest of the first season on the American streaming service Netflix.

== Plot ==
Frank (Kevin Spacey) learns that Linda (Sakina Jaffrey) and House Speaker Bob Birch (Larry Pine) are refusing to compromise on the education bill. He discourages President Walker (Michel Gill) from compromising on the bill, saying doing so will make Walker look weak. Frank offers to help Majority Leader David Rasmussen (Michael Siberry) become the next Speaker in exchange for ousting Birch. Frank and Doug (Michael Kelly) also offer Black Caucus leader Terry Womack (Curtiss Cook) the Majority Leader position once Rasmussen becomes Speaker.

To win Womack's support, Frank forces Russo (Corey Stoll) to allow a shipyard in his district to close in order to keep a military base open in Womack's. Russo agrees, despite his fear that the resulting job losses will erode his voter base. After Russo gets drunk and leaves his children alone at his apartment, Christina (Kristen Connolly) breaks up with him. With Womack's support, Frank gets enough votes in the House to oust Birch but tells the Speaker that he will not vote against him if Womack is appointed as Rasmussen's replacement. Both Frank and Birch announce their agreement to Rasmussen, who resigns.

Meanwhile, Claire (Robin Wright) is visited by Remy (Mahershala Ali), who offers a double donation of $1.5 million if the Clean Water Initiative forms a partnership with SanCorp. Despite needing the funds for Gillian's South Sudan project, Claire turns it down after consulting with Frank. Instead of taking favors from SanCorp, Frank decides to organize a fundraising gala. To further showcase the CWI, Claire invites Adam Galloway (Ben Daniels), a New York-based photographer with whom she had a relationship in past. Galloway invites Claire for dinner and they share an intimate moment, but she turns down his advances and makes it clear their relation is to be business only.

Tensions further escalate between Zoe (Kate Mara) and Hammerschmidt (Boris McGiver) when The Washington Herald's owner, Margaret Tilden (Kathleen Chalfant), allows Zoe to continue her work. In order to avoid any further clashes, Hammerschmidt offers Janine's (Constance Zimmer) job as White House correspondent to Zoe. Despite her reluctance, both Janine and Lucas (Sebastian Arcelus) encourage her to take the position. However, Frank persuades Zoe not to take it. As a result, Hammerschmidt angrily calls her a "cunt", which she tweets about before resigning from the Herald. Zoe invites Frank to her apartment, where they end up having sex.

== Cast ==
Following is the list of billed cast.

=== Main ===
- Kevin Spacey as U.S. Representative Francis J. Underwood
- Robin Wright as Claire Underwood, Francis' wife
- Kate Mara as Zoe Barnes, reporter at The Washington Herald
- Corey Stoll as U.S. Representative Peter Russo
- Michael Kelly as Doug Stamper, Underwood's Chief of Staff
- Sakina Jaffrey as Linda Vasquez, White House Chief of Staff
- Kristen Connolly as Christina Gallagher, a congressional staffer
- Sandrine Holt as Gillian Cole, employee at CWI
- Boris McGiver as Tom Hammerschmidt, editor-in-chief for The Washington Herald
- Constance Zimmer as Janine Skorsky, reporter
- Sebastian Arcelus as Lucas Goodwin, editor and reporter at The Washington Herald
- Michel Gill as President Garrett Walker
- Ben Daniels as Adam Galloway, a New York-based photographer and Claire's love interest
- Mahershala Ali as Remy Danton, lawyer for Glendon Hill and lobbyist

=== Recurring ===
- Larry Pine as House Speaker Bob Birch
- Reg E. Cathey as Freddy
- Michael Siberry as Majority Leader David Rasmussen
- Karl Kenzler as Charles Holburn
- Francie Swift as Felicity Holburn
- Kathleen Chalfant as Margaret Tilden
- Daisy Tahan as Sarah Russo

== Reception ==
The episode received positive reviews from critics; however Ryan McGee of The A.V. Club said, "House Of Cards is limiting the current time spent with its most fascinating aspects."

== Notes ==
- This article incorporates material derived from the "Chapter 4" article on the House of Cards wiki at Fandom (formerly Wikia) and is licensed under the Creative Commons Attribution-Share Alike 3.0 License (6 September 2016).
