= Chapter 5 (House of Cards) =

- House of Cards episode
- Episode no.: Season 1 Episode 5
- Directed by: Joel Schumacher
- Written by: Sarah Treem
- Cinematography by: Eigil Bryld
- Editing by: Michelle Tesoro
- Production code: HOC-105
- Original release date: February 1, 2013
- Running time: 52 minutes

Episode chronology
← Previous "Chapter 4"	Next → "Chapter 6"
- House of Cards (season 1)

"Chapter 5" is the fifth episode of the first season of the American political thriller drama series House of Cards. Written by Sarah Treem and directed by Joel Schumacher, the episode premiered on February 1, 2013, when it was released along with the rest of the first season on the American streaming service Netflix.

== Plot ==
Zoe (Kate Mara) tells Frank (Kevin Spacey) about job offers she is getting from different media outlets, including an online publication called Slugline. She also talks about Hammerschmidt (Boris McGiver), who fired her from The Washington Herald, and all the press that both of them are getting as a result. Frank drops her phone into a glass of water to avoid any press leak of their conversation and buys her two phones: one for work and others for their conversations. When Frank returns to Claire (Robin Wright), she asks about Zoe. Frank says that she is a "mouthpiece and can be controlled."

At Russo's (Corey Stoll) office, Christina (Kristen Connolly) packs her stuff and leaves, to his distress. Meanwhile, Frank has a heated conversation with Marty Spinella (Al Sapienza), the head lobbyist for the teachers' union, who is infuriated because Frank lied to him. Meanwhile, Zoe decides to take the job at Slugline. At the Democratic National Committee, Frank attends a meeting led by DNC chair Patricia Whittaker (Suzanne Savoy).

A friend of Russo's, Paul Capra (Wass Stevens), comes to his office to ask him to stop the closure of the shipyard and save the 12,000 jobs it provides. Paul reminds him that his promise to keep the shipyard open was what got him elected in the first place. Peter cannot reveal that Frank forced him to refuse to give testimony against the closure at the hearing. Paul leaves, angrily declaring that Peter isn't the person he used to be.

Frank suspects that Spinella is organizing a massive teachers' strike, and he and Doug (Michael Kelly) think of a plan to stop him. He also reveals that he wants Russo to run for governor of Pennsylvania, but he has a bigger agenda behind this. After turning down Remy (Mahershala Ali), Claire is having doubts because the gala is only raising half a million dollars. She calls Adam, who ignores the call. Moreover, Frank pledges to do all he can for Claire's gala and starts inviting every person he knows. Margaret Tilden (Kathleen Chalfant) fires Hammerschmidt in the wake of his profane outburst against Zoe and his going against her despite Tilden's warning.

At Zoe's apartment, Frank tells her that they cannot have a relationship without protection. To give him leverage over her, Zoe lets Frank take nude photos. Spinella gets enraged when the National Education Association (NEA) backs out from a partnership with his union in the middle of the strike plan. Spinella contacts unionized workers at the Cotesworth Hotel, which is hosting Claire's fundraising gala, and gets them to refuse to work for the event.

Claire calls Frank, who despite his efforts cannot get the hotel to side against the union. As the gala is just hours away, Claire decides to have it outside the hotel, and Frank gets his entire staff to help out. While the hotel staff and Spinella resist, fire regulations mean they can't lock the gates to prevent it. Spinella brings in union members to protest for the media in front of the gala, but at the end of the dinner, Frank makes himself look good by handing out food to the protesters on camera. The gala is enormously successful and raises enough money for Claire's project.

In the end, a drunk and disheveled Russo awaits on the steps of the Underwoods' home for their arrival. Without saying anything, Claire and Frank invite him inside and ask him to stay the night in their guest suite. There, privately, Russo lashes out at Frank for ruining his life. After listening to him quietly, Frank takes Russo to the bathroom and tells him that he is the only person who still believes in him and that he wants him to run for governor, but only if he can pull his life back together. Frank also leaves him a razor blade, if he thinks everything is over. In the morning, a chastened Russo – now well and truly Frank's man – leaves the house, thanking his hosts.

== Cast ==
Following is the list of billed cast.

=== Main ===
- Kevin Spacey as U.S. Representative, Francis J. Underwood
- Robin Wright as Claire Underwood, Francis' wife
- Kate Mara as Zoe Barnes, reporter at The Washington Herald
- Corey Stoll as U.S. Representative Peter Russo
- Michael Kelly as Doug Stamper, Underwood's Chief of Staff
- Kristen Connolly as Christina Gallagher, a congressional staffer
- Sandrine Holt as Gillian Cole, an employee at CWI
- Ben Daniels as Adam Galloway, a New York-based photographer and Claire's love interest
- Boris McGiver as Tom Hammerschmidt, editor-in-chief for The Washington Herald

=== Recurring ===
- Elizabeth Norment as Nancy Kaufberger
- Nathan Darrow as Edward Meechum
- Reg E. Cathey as Freddy
- Al Sapienza as Martin Spinella
- Karl Kenzler as Charles Holburn
- Francie Swift as Felicity Holburn
- Kathleen Chalfant as Margaret Tilden
- Tawny Cypress as Carly Heath
- Paul Capra as Wass Stevens

== Reception ==
The episode received positive reviews from critics. Ryan McGee of The A.V. Club said, "House Of Cards doesn't have a woman problem because we understand Frank and Peter better than we do Claire and Zoe at this point. But it does have a narrative problem when only 50% of its central storylines engage the audience on an emotional level." He further said, "We don't need to know everything now. But we need a toehold, at least, to understand why we need to care about these two for the next eight hours and beyond."

== Notes ==
- This article incorporates material derived from the "Chapter 5" article on the House of Cards wiki at Fandom (formerly Wikia) and is licensed under the Creative Commons Attribution-Share Alike 3.0 License (6 September 2016).
