= Chapter 1 (House of Cards) =

- House of Cards episode
- Episode no.: Season 1 Episode 1
- Directed by: David Fincher
- Written by: Beau Willimon
- Cinematography by: Eigil Bryld
- Editing by: Kirk Baxter
- Production code: HOC-101
- Original release date: February 1, 2013
- Running time: 56 minutes

Episode chronology
← Previous —	Next → "Chapter 2"
- House of Cards season 1

"Chapter 1" is the pilot episode and the first episode of the first season of the American political thriller drama television series House of Cards. It premiered on February 1, 2013, when it was released along with the rest of the first season on the American streaming service Netflix. This episode became the first streaming television webisode to earn Primetime Emmy Awards and nominations. "Chapter 1" was written by series developer Beau Willimon and directed by executive producer David Fincher. The episode also earned 3 other Emmy nominations as well as Writers Guild of America Award for Television: Episodic Drama and Directors Guild of America Award for Outstanding Directing – Drama Series nominations.

Frank Underwood (Kevin Spacey) is an ambitious Democratic congressman and the House Majority Whip. Underwood helped ensure the election of President Garrett Walker (Michel Gill), who promised to appoint Underwood as Secretary of State. However, before Walker is sworn in, Chief of Staff Linda Vasquez (Sakina Jaffrey) announces that the president will not honor the agreement and will instead nominate Senator Michael Kern. Furious at Walker's betrayal, Underwood and his wife Claire (Robin Wright), an environmental activist, make a pact to destroy Kern. When Zoe Barnes (Kate Mara) makes her resources available, she becomes one of their pawns.

The episode was well received by most television critics. They praised the production values of the series as well as the performances of the lead actors.

== Plot ==
Frank Underwood, confronted by the broken promise from the president, begins laying down track to run over those who wronged him. Zoe Barnes, frustrated by her lowly status at the newspaper, seeks to form alliances that will allow her to prosper professionally.

— Episode 1 synopsis from The New York Times

Francis "Frank" Underwood (Kevin Spacey), a U.S. congressman and Democratic Majority Whip, leaves his Washington, D.C. residence after hearing his neighbors’ dog get hit by a car leaving it mortally wounded. He comforts the dog before calmly strangling it. Frank and his wife, Claire (Robin Wright), go on to attend a New Year's Eve party in honor of President-elect Garrett Walker (Michel Gill). Frank addresses the audience and confesses that he does not like Walker, but he promised him the position of Secretary of State.

Frank meets with Chief of Staff Linda Vasquez (Sakina Jaffrey) and is informed that she and Walker have decided to retract their promise of nominating Frank so that he can aid the President's education agenda in Congress. Despite his assurances to Linda that he will remain Walker's ally, Frank feels personally betrayed and begins formulating a plan for revenge. After receiving a picture of Frank leering at her backside, Washington Herald reporter Zoe Barnes (Kate Mara) pays a late-night visit to Frank at his home. She offers to be Frank's undercover mouthpiece in the press in exchange for the elevated profile that she would gain from breaking substantive stories. Meanwhile, Peter Russo (Corey Stoll), a young and inexperienced congressman from Philadelphia, is arrested for drunk driving with prostitute Rachel Posner (Rachel Brosnahan). Stamper, Underwood's Chief of Staff, learns about the arrest and immediately contacts the D.C. police commissioner, offering Frank's support for his mayoral campaign in exchange for releasing Russo. Russo is picked up from jail by his secretary and romantic partner, Christina Gallagher (Kristen Connolly), and falsely tells her that he was alone when he was arrested.

Frank meets with Donald Blythe (Reed Birney), a progressive congressman with whom Walker wants to collaborate on his education bill. Frank dismisses his proposal as too ambitious and asks Blythe to rewrite it, but secretly passes a copy to Zoe. He then meets with Senator Catherine Durant (Jayne Atkinson) and suggests that she ought to consider seeking the nomination for Secretary of State. Frank also privately confronts Russo about his arrest and demands his loyalty in exchange for making the incident disappear. Zoe takes the draft of Blythe's bill to the Herald's political editor, Lucas Goodwin (Sebastian Arcelus), and its chief editor, Tom Hammerschmidt (Boris McGiver), who gives her the lead on the story over chief political correspondent Janine Skorsky (Constance Zimmer).

== Casting ==
In order billed in the episode opening credits:

- Kevin Spacey as U.S. Representative Francis J. Underwood
- Robin Wright as Claire Underwood, Francis' wife
- Kate Mara as Zoe Barnes, a reporter
- Corey Stoll as U.S. Representative Peter Russo
- Michael Kelly as Doug Stamper, Underwood's Chief of Staff
- Sakina Jaffrey as Linda Vasquez, White House Chief of Staff
- Kristen Connolly as Christina Gallagher, a congressional staffer
- Sebastian Arcelus as Lucas Goodwin
- Boris McGiver as Tom Hammerschmidt, editor-in-chief for The Washington Herald
- Constance Zimmer as Janine Skorsky, a reporter
- Jayne Atkinson as Senator Catherine Durant
- Michel Gill as Garrett Walker, the President
- Dan Ziskie as Jim Matthews, the Vice President
- Elizabeth Norment as Nancy Kaufberger
- Reed Birney as Rep. Donald Blythe
- Kevin Kilner as Michael Kern
- Francie Swift as Felicity Holburn
- Karl Kenzler as Senator Charles Holburn
- Chuck Cooper as Barney Hull
- Maryann Plunkett as Evelyn Baxter
- Chance Kelly as Steve
- Rachel Brosnahan as Rachel Posner, a former prostitute
- Reg E. Cathey as Freddy Hayes, the owner of Freddy's BBQ

== Production ==
The episode was directed by David Fincher and was written by Beau Willimon. Willimon had previously served as an aide to Senators Chuck Schumer and Hillary Clinton of New York, and DNC Chair Howard Dean. Independent studio Media Rights Capital purchased the rights to House of Cards, with the intent on creating a series. Netflix agreed to contribute an undisclosed fixed fee to production costs in March 2011. As he was completing his work on The Curious Case of Benjamin Button, Fincher was introduced to the original miniseries by his agent and sought to develop a series with Eric Roth. House of Cards was pitched to several cable networks, including HBO, AMC and Showtime. Netflix, interested in launching their own original programming, outbid the networks, picking the series up for 26 episodes, totaling two seasons. Netflix was the only bidder that was interested in purchasing the rights without seeing a completed pilot. Thus, the show was not forced into manipulating story arcs introduced in the pilot to create artificial cliffhangers.

=== Casting ===
"I was lucky to get into film at a time that was very interesting for drama. But if you look now, the focus is not on the same kind of films that were made in the 90s. When I look now, the most interesting plots, the most interesting characters, they are on TV."

— Kevin Spacey

Fincher stated that every main cast member was their first choice. In the first read through, he said "I want everybody here to know that you represent our first choice – each actor here represents our first choice for these characters. So do not fuck this up." Spacey, whose last regular television role was in the series Wiseguy, responded positively to the script. He then played Richard III, which Fincher said was "great training". Spacey supported the decision to release all of the episodes at once, believing that this type of release pattern will be increasingly common with television shows. He said, "When I ask my friends what they did with their weekend, they say, 'Oh, I stayed in and watched three seasons of Breaking Bad' or it's two seasons of Game of Thrones". He was officially cast on March 18, 2011. Robin Wright was approached by Fincher to star in the series when they worked together in The Girl with the Dragon Tattoo. She was cast as Claire Underwood in June 2011. Kate Mara was cast as Zoe Barnes in early February 2012. Mara's sister, Rooney Mara, worked with Fincher in The Girl with the Dragon Tattoo, and when Kate Mara read the part of Zoe, she "fell in love with the character" and asked her sister to "put in a word for me with Fincher". The next month, she got a call for an audition.

=== Filming ===
While Netflix had ventured into original programming by greenlighting foreign shows that were new to United States audiences with shows such as Lilyhammer, House of Cards represented the first show made for Netflix. Filming for the first season began in January 2012 in Harford County, Maryland.

"Chapter 1" sets the tone for the environs of the series. According to David Carr the political environs have such "marbleness" that it belies the clandestine nature of political activities, including those of Underwood who says he is there to "clear the pipes and keep the sludge moving". The fictional newspaper, The Washington Herald, is set with "brutal" lighting and drab furniture, in part because it was filmed at the real world offices of The Baltimore Sun. Carr uses several pejorative adjectives to describe Barnes' apartment including sad, grubby, dirty, dreary and humble but note that this implies that the digital revolution is dominated by people "on laptops who have no furniture". Similarly, Underwood and his associates are nattily clad, Barnes shows a lack of fashion recognition.

=== Release ===
The episode was released online by Netflix on February 1, 2013, as part of the simultaneous release of all 13 episodes of season 1 of the series. The debut date was a weekend when there was little competition on television other than Super Bowl XLVII and a new episode of Downton Abbey on PBS. Netflix broadcast "Chapter 1" and "Chapter 2" to critics several days in advance of the release.

== Reception ==
=== Reviews ===
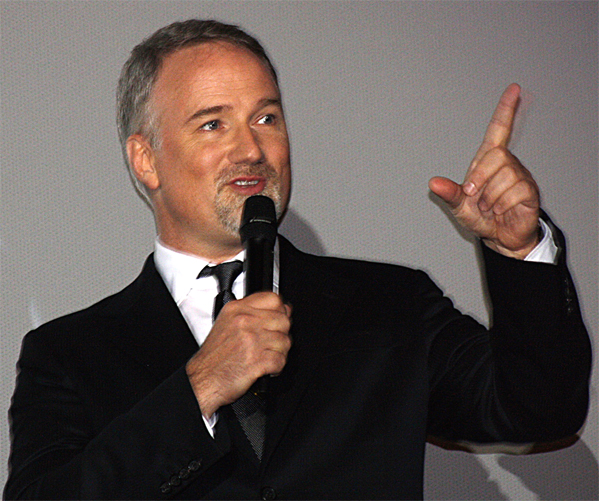
David Fincher was praised for his direction of the pilot episode, receiving a Primetime Emmy Award for his work.

The episode received positive reviews from critics. Elements of the opening scene were lauded. Matt Roush of TV Guide praised Spacey's self introduction as a Machiavellian politician in which he says "I have no patience for useless things." The Boston Globe's Matthew Gilbert noted that "the first two episodes were expertly directed by David Fincher" and Spacey's harmonious cadence such as those used in the first scene of this episode "makes even his character's mercy killing of an injured dog – which he does by hand – seem a little less brutal." Not only is Underwood described as Machiavellian, one critic from The New York Times notes that his belief in the omnipresence of dirt expressed as "Nobody's a Boy Scout, not even a Boy Scout" harkens back to Willie Stark in All the King's Men who said "There's always something".

Time television critic James Poniewozik, notes that by the end of the first episode Frank establishes that his metaphor of choice is meat because both literally and figuratively it is his preference. He may begin a day with a celebratory rack of ribs, because "I'm feelin' hungry today!", but also he describes life with meat metaphors: he describes the White House Chief of Staff with grudging admiration: "She's as tough as a two-dollar steak."; he plans to destroy an enemy the way "you devour a whale. One bite at a time"; and he endures a tedious weekly meeting with House leaders, he tells us, by "[imagining] their lightly salted faces frying in a skillet." Poniewozik notes that all of this comes from a character whose name, Underwood is a reference to the hallmark deviled ham of the William Underwood Company.

Roush also notes that the first two weeks show how Claire "runs a charity with a brutally iron fist". While Frank is Machiavellian, Claire presents a woman urging on her husband's assertion of power in the image of Lady Macbeth. Hank Stuever of The Washington Post describes her as an ice-queen wife. She encourages his vices while noting her disapproval of his weakness saying "My husband doesn't apologize...even to me." Nancy deWolf Smith of The Wall Street Journal describes what she sees of their relationship in the first two episodes as pivotal to the show's success: "Benign though they may seem – and their harmless air is what makes the Underwoods so effective as political plotters – this is a power couple with the same malignant chemistry as pairs of serial killers, where each needs the other in order to become lethal".

Gilbert also notes that Mara's surprising naivete is a welcome respite against a backdrop of a "terminally jaded" cast. As the show begins, aspiring journalist Zoe Barnes is desperate to rise from covering the "Fairfax County Council" beat to covering "'what's behind the veil' of power in the Capitol hallways." Alessandra Stanley of The New York Times notes that by the end of the first episode, Mara's Barnes is among the cadre of Frank's accomplices. After she pleads for a relationship with him by promising to earn his trust and not "ask any questions", Frank uses her fiendishly. However, Ashley Parker of The New York Times considers her unfathomably aggressive and too overt, transactional and sexual. Parker points out that Barnes' statement "I protect your identity, I print what you tell me, and I'll never ask any questions" almost discredits itself.

The Washington Post's Stuever has many complaints about the show including the fact that it is about Washington, DC, but filmed in Baltimore. He also complains about its entrance into the television landscape littered with "more fictitious administrations than anyone can keep track of". He says that perspective will affect your perception of the show. Those not already inundated with "Type A personalities inside the Beltway" in their daily lives may be drawn to the show. However, it is not likely a show that will serve well those who spend a lot of time with the issues that the show deals with. After viewing the first two episodes, Stuever also finds fault with the use of breaking the fourth wall, describing it as "the show's unwise narrative trope". The Wall Street Journal's Smith defends the fourth wall as an "artifice that generally works well here to loosen our bearings".

Ryan McGee of The A.V. Club notes Russo seems to employ vices without restraint, which is a respite from the other exacting characters in the episode and a makes him a sort of metaphor for the show. McGee also notes that the episode includes "establishing shots within Zoe's apartment that offer up almost everything you need to know about her current position in life".

=== Accolades ===
On July 18, 2013, House of Cards (along with Netflix's other series, Arrested Development and Hemlock Grove) earned the first Primetime Emmy Award nominations for original online only streaming television for the 65th Primetime Emmy Awards in 2013. Among House of Cards' nine nominations, "Chapter 1" received four nominations for the 65th Primetime Emmy Awards and 65th Primetime Creative Arts Emmy Awards becoming the first webisode (online-only episode) of a television series to receive a major Primetime Emmy Award nomination: Outstanding Directing for a Drama Series for David Fincher. This episode also received several Creative Arts Emmy Award nominations, including Outstanding Cinematography for a Single-Camera Series, Outstanding Single-Camera Picture Editing for a Drama Series, and Outstanding Music Composition for a Series (Original Dramatic). "Chapter 1" was also Spacey's pick to support his nomination for Outstanding Lead Actor in a Drama Series.

On September 15, at the Creative Arts Emmy Award presentation, "Chapter 1" and Eigil Bryld earned the Primetime Emmy Award for Outstanding Cinematography for a Single-Camera Series, making "Chapter 1" the first ever Emmy-awarded webisode. Then on September 22, David Fincher won Outstanding Directing for a Drama Series for directing the pilot episode "Chapter 1", bringing the series to a total of three wins and marking the first ever win for a webisode at the Primetime Emmy award ceremony. None of the Emmy awards were considered to be in major categories, however.

Award	Year	Category	Recipient	Result
Primetime Emmy Award	2013 Primetime	Outstanding Directing for a Drama Series	David Fincher	Won
Primetime Emmy Award	2013 Primetime Creative Arts	Outstanding Cinematography for a Single-Camera Series	Eigil Bryld	Won
Primetime Emmy Award	2013 Primetime Creative Arts	Outstanding Single-Camera Picture Editing for a Drama Series	Kirk Baxter	Nominated
Primetime Emmy Award	2013 Primetime Creative Arts	Outstanding Music Composition for a Series (Original Dramatic Score)	Jeff Beal	Nominated
Writers Guild of America Award	Writers Guild of America Awards 2013	Television: Episodic Drama	Beau Willimon	Nominated
Directors Guild of America Award	2014 Directors Guild of America Awards	Drama Series	David Fincher	Nominated
