= Heart (1999 film) =

1999 film

- Directed by: Charles McDougall
- Written by: Jimmy McGovern
- Starring: Saskia Reeves; Christopher Eccleston
- Release date: 6 May 1999
- Running time: 81 minutes
- Country: United Kingdom
- Language: English

Heart is a 1999 British thriller film written by Jimmy McGovern and directed by Charles McDougall.

== Cast ==
- Saskia Reeves - Maria Ann McCardle
- Christopher Eccleston - Gary Ellis
- Kate Hardie - Tess Ellis
- Rhys Ifans - Alex Madden
- Anna Chancellor - Nicola Farmer
- Matthew Rhys - Sean McCardle
- Jack Deam - Policeman
- Kate Rutter - Sister Mary
- Nicholas Moss - Doctor
- Bill Paterson - Mr. Kreitman
