= Ex-Girlfriends =

- Film poster
- Directed by: Alexander Poe
- Written by: Alexander Poe
- Produced by: Jennifer Gerber
- Starring: Alexander Poe; Jennifer Carpenter; Kristen Connolly
- Cinematography: Gregory Kershaw
- Edited by: Jennifer Gerber
- Production company: Poe/films
- Distributed by: FilmBuff
- Release date: October 20, 2012 (Austin)
- Running time: 72 minutes
- Country: United States
- Language: English

Ex-Girlfriends is a 2012 American romantic comedy-drama film written and directed by Alexander Poe and starring Poe, Jennifer Carpenter and Kristen Connolly. It is Poe's directorial debut.

== Cast ==
- Alexander Poe as Graham
- Jennifer Carpenter as Kate
- Kristen Connolly as Laura
- Liz Holtan as Samantha
- Noah Bean as Tom
- Matt McGrath as Professor O'Donnelly
- Teddy Bergman as Paul
- Will Janowitz as Matt
- Ian Unterman as Ben

== Reception ==
As of June 2020, the film holds a 29% approval rating on Rotten Tomatoes, based on seven reviews with an average rating of 3.31/10. Matt Singer of Time Out gave the film one star out of five. Chuck Bowen of Slant Magazine gave it half a star out of four.
