= Charles McDougall =

British television and film director

Charles McDougall is a British director.

== Biography ==
McDougall has directed for television series, which include the pilot episode of ABC's Desperate Housewives (which includes the unaired pilot as well). McDougall has also directed episodes of Queer as Folk on Channel 4 and Sex and the City on HBO. McDougall directed the first two episodes of the TV series The Tudors, as well as an episode of Good Behavior. He won an Emmy for Best Directing for a Comedy Series for his work on Desperate Housewives.

McDougall was an executive producer and director for the pilot episode of The Good Wife. Penned by Robert King and Michelle King (In Justice), the legal drama focuses on a politician's wife (Julianna Margulies) who carves out her own niche as a defense attorney. The Kings and McDougall are executive producing with Ridley Scott, Tony Scott, and David Zucker.

== Filmography ==
=== Film ===
Short film

Year	Title	Notes
1992	Dogs Playing Poker	Segment of Inside Out III
1992	Put Asunder	Segments of Inside Out IV
1992	Save the Wetlands	Segments of Inside Out IV
1999	Steal Away	Segment of Tube Tales
2005	Desperate Housewives: Oprah Winfrey Is the New Neighbor	

Feature film

- Arrivederci Millwall (1990)
- Heart (1999)
- Ana (2020)

=== Television ===
TV movies

Year	Title	Director	Executive Producer
1996	Hillsborough	Yes	No
1997	Rules of Engagement	Yes	No
2002	Sunday	Yes	No
2004	Call Me: The Rise and Fall of Heidi Fleiss	Yes	No
2006	Surrender, Dorothy	Yes	No
2007	Backyards & Bullets	Yes	Yes
2008	Good Behavior	Yes	No
2017	Shelter	Yes	Yes

TV series

Year	Title	Director	Executive Producer	Notes
1991	Casualty	Yes	No	Episode "Dangerous Games"
1992	Between the Lines	Yes	No	3 episodes
1994	99-1	Yes	No	2 episodes
1995	Cracker	Yes	No	2 episodes
1999	Queer as Folk	Yes	No	4 episodes; Co-creator
2000	Wonderland	Yes	No	Episode "20/20 Hindsight"
2000–2002	Sex and the City	Yes	No	6 episodes
2002	Push, Nevada	Yes	No	Episode "The Black Box"
2003	Keen Eddie	Yes	No	Episode "Achtung Baby"
2004	Desperate Housewives	Yes	No	Episode "Pilot"
2005–2012	The Office	Yes	No	8 episodes
2006	Big Love	Yes	No	2 episodes
2007	The Tudors	Yes	Yes	2 episodes
2007	Big Shots	Yes	No	Episode "Pilot"
2009	The Good Wife	Yes	Yes	2 episodes
2009–2011	Parks and Recreation	Yes	No	Episodes "Kaboom" and "Pawnee Rangers"
2011	The Chicago Code	Yes	Yes	Episode "Pilot"
2012–2013	The Mindy Project	Yes	Yes	3 episodes
2013	House of Cards	Yes	No	Episode "Chapter 7" and "Chapter 8"
2014	Resurrection	Yes	Yes	Episode "The Returned"
2015	Mad Dogs	Yes	Yes	Episode "Pilot"
2015	Secrets and Lies	Yes	Yes	Episode "The Trail"
2016	The Secret Agent	Yes	No	3 episodes
2019	Four Weddings and a Funeral	Yes	No	2 episodes
2022	Julia	Yes	No	Episode "Omelette"
2023	Three Little Birds	Yes	No	2 episodes
