= The Washington Herald (House of Cards) =

Fictional newspaper in the television series House of Cards

The fictional Washington Herald, with the main headline being the fictional U.S. President Frank Underwood asking the Senate to approve his declaration of war

The Washington Herald is a fictional daily newspaper in the Netflix series House of Cards. The building and offices of The Baltimore Sun were used to film the newsroom. The Washington Herald is largely based on the actual Washington Post. Another fictional newspaper in the series called The Wall Street Telegraph is largely based on the actual Wall Street Journal.

== Story line ==
Tom Hammerschmidt is the fictional Washington Herald editor-in-chief. He presides over a newsroom that included the White House correspondent Janine Skorsky, the political editor Lucas Goodwin, and upstart reporter Zoe Barnes who later moves to "Slugline" (also fictional). The character Lucas Goodwin is a national politics reporter and editor at The Washington Herald. He appeared as a main character in the first, second and fourth seasons of House of Cards. He had previously worked on the paper's crime beat as well. Lucas Goodwin is romantically involved with Zoe Barnes, who is heavily involved in investigating the former "Congressman" now "U.S. Vice President" Frank Underwood. After owner Margaret Tilden forces Tom Hammerschmidt to resign, Lucas takes on further editorial responsibilities at the newspaper, becoming deputy editor and continuing the investigation Zoe had conducted after the latter's sudden death. Lucas participates in an act of cyber-terrorism upon which he is arrested and imprisoned. Two years after being imprisoned, Lucas is released, assuming a new identity.

The series also features journalists working in other fictional newspapers, like Ayla Sayyad and Kate Baldwin working in the fictitious "Wall Street Telegraph”.
