= Kate Barnow =

American screenwriter

Kate Barnow is an American screenwriter, best known for her work on the HBO vampire series True Blood.

== Early career ==
Barnow began her television career working as an assistant to the executive producers on the sitcom Will & Grace. She then worked as a script co-ordinator on the short-lived Studio 60 on the Sunset Strip. She was then hired as writer's assistants on True Blood for the first season. Her writing debut came with the tenth episode of season 2 of True Blood.

== True Blood episodes ==
- 2.10 New World in My View
- 3.4 9 Crimes
- 3.10 I Smell a Rat
- 6.7 In the Evening
- 6.10 Radioactive
- 7.2 I Found You
- 7.8 Almost Home
