= Eigil Bryld =

Danish cinematographer (born 1971)

- Born: 27 February 1971 (age 55); Odense, Denmark
- Education: Gwent College
- Occupation: Cinematographer
- Years active: 1996–present
- Website: eigilbryld.com

Eigil Bryld (Danish pronunciation: [ˈɑjkil ˈpʁylˀ]) is a Danish cinematographer.

== Background ==
Bryld grew up in Denmark, and as a teenager used to work in a local television station.

He earned a degree in film and video production from Gwent College in Wales in 1992, where he studied under photographer David Hurn. He worked in London before moving to New York City.

== Personal life ==
Bryld is married to Danish author Naja Marie Aidt and they had a son in 2003.

== Filmography ==
=== Film ===
Year	Title	Director
1996	Den attende	Anders Rønnow Klarlund
1997	Dazlak – Skinhead	Helke Sander
1999	Possessed	Anders Rønnow Klarlund
1999	Wisconsin Death Trip	James Marsh
2000	Ved verdens ende	Anders Rønnow Klarlund
2000	Before the Storm	Reza Parsa
2002	Charlie Butterfly	Dariusz Steiness
2004	Oh Happy Day	Hella Joof
2003	To Kill a King	Mike Barker
2005	The King	James Marsh
2005	Kinky Boots	Julian Jarrold
2006	Pu-239	Scott Z. Burns
2007	Becoming Jane	Julian Jarrold
2008	In Bruges	Martin McDonagh
2009	Paper Man	Kieran Mulroney; Michele Mulroney
2012	Not Fade Away	David Chase
2017	Tulip Fever	Justin Chadwick
2018	Ocean's 8	Gary Ross
2019	The Report	Scott Z. Burns
2022	Deep Water	Adrian Lyne
2023	The Machine	Peter Atencio
2023	No Hard Feelings	Gene Stupnitsky
2023	The Holdovers	Alexander Payne
2026	The Breadwinner	Eric Appel
2026	Evil Genius	Courteney Cox
2027	Somewhere Out There	Alexander Payne

Documentary film

Year	Title	Director
1997	De trofaste døde	Anders Leifer

=== Television ===
Miniseries

Year	Title	Director
2002	Crime and Punishment	Julian Jarrold
2016	Crisis in Six Scenes	Woody Allen

TV movies

Year	Title	Director
2010	You Don't Know Jack	Barry Levinson
2011	Tilda	Bill Condon
2017	The Wizard of Lies	Barry Levinson

TV series

Year	Title	Director	Notes
2013	House of Cards	David Fincher; James Foley; Joel Schumacher; Charles McDougall; Carl Franklin	11 episodes
2019	The Loudest Voice	Kari Skogland; Jeremy Podeswa	4 episodes
2023	Extrapolations	Scott Z. Burns	Episode "2066: Lola"

== Awards and nominations ==
Year	Award	Category	Title	Result	Ref.
2001	BAFTA Awards	Best Factual Photography	Wisconsin Death Trip	Won	
2010	Primetime Emmy Awards	Outstanding Cinematography for TV Movie	You Don't Know Jack	Nominated	
2013	Primetime Emmy Awards	Outstanding Cinematography	House of Cards (For the episode "Chapter 1")	Won	
2023	Independent Spirit Awards	Best Cinematography	The Holdovers	Won	
