= Claire Underwood =

Fictional character from House of Cards

- House of Cards character
- Robin Wright as Claire Underwood
- First appearance: "Chapter 1"; February 1, 2013
- Last appearance: "Chapter 73"; November 2, 2018
- Created by: Beau Willimon
- Portrayed by: Robin Wright; Ann Charles Sutton (child); Willa Fitzgerald (young adult)

In-universe information
- Full name: Claire Hale Underwood
- Title: President of the United States
- Occupation: CEO of Clean Water Initiative (2004–2013); Second Lady of the United States (2013–2014); U.S. Ambassador to the United Nations (2015); First Lady of the United States (2014–2017); Vice President of the United States (2017); President of the United States (2017–2021)
- Family: Elizabeth Hale (mother)
- Spouse: Frank Underwood (m. 1987; died 2017)
- Religion: Atheism (de facto); Christianity (de jure)
- Nationality: American
- Party: Democratic
- Hometown: Highland Park, Texas
- Alma mater: Radcliffe College (BSc); Harvard University (MPH)
- Based on: Elizabeth Urquhart

Claire Underwood (née Hale) is a fictional character in House of Cards, played by Robin Wright. She is the wife of the show's protagonist Frank Underwood (Kevin Spacey) and the main protagonist in the final season. She is a lobbyist and runs an environmental nonprofit organization, but in later seasons ascends to the positions of Second Lady of the United States, First Lady of the United States, the United States Ambassador to the United Nations, Vice President of the United States, and finally the 47th President of the United States. Claire made her first appearance in the series' pilot episode, "Chapter 1". The character is based on Elizabeth Urquhart, a character from the eponymous British miniseries from which the current series is derived. Unlike the original character, however, Claire has her own storylines.

The role has been critically acclaimed. Wright won the Golden Globe Award for Best Actress – Television Series Drama for this role at the 71st Golden Globe Awards, becoming the first actress to win a Golden Globe Award for a streaming television online-only role in a series. She was nominated for the Primetime Emmy Award for Outstanding Lead Actress in a Drama Series for this role at the 65th, 66th, 67th, 68th, 69th and 71st Primetime Emmy Awards.

In November 2017, Netflix fired Spacey from the series after a number of people accused him of sexual misconduct. The Frank Underwood character was written out of the show as having died, and Claire became the main character of the show's sixth and final season.

== Character overview ==
Claire Hale Underwood is originally from the exclusive Highland Park enclave of Dallas, Texas. Her late father was a major Texas Republican. While studying Environmental Health and Chemistry at Radcliffe College in Cambridge, she met Francis J. "Frank" Underwood, a Harvard Law student from South Carolina. She subsequently achieved a masters in public health from Harvard University. She is from a wealthy family, and the show characterizes her as a "Dallas Debutante" and "Lily White". She recounts her father's taking her to Dealey Plaza, where John F. Kennedy was assassinated, and that it made her feel "so sad, so angry". She has a difficult relationship with her mother, Elizabeth Hale (Ellen Burstyn), who despises Frank and is disappointed in Claire for marrying him.

Brian Stelter of The New York Times described her as Frank Underwood's conniving wife and described the Underwoods as "the scheming husband and wife at the center of 'House of Cards'". She is a woman "who will stop at nothing to conquer everything". Hank Stuever of The Washington Post describes her as an "ice-queen wife". The Independent's Sarah Hughes echoes this description, saying Claire is so dedicated to the couple's schemes that it is clear she will execute them herself if Frank wavers. Following season 4, Robin Wright stated that she felt Claire Underwood was the equal of Frank Underwood and demanded equal pay for her performance. Netflix acquiesced.

=== Relationship with Frank ===
While Frank is Machiavellian, Claire presents a woman urging on her husband's assertion of power in the image of Lady Macbeth. She encourages his vices while noting her disapproval of his weaknesses, saying: "My husband doesn't apologize ... even to me." This gives a credibility to their symbiosis.

Willimon notes that "What's extraordinary about Frank and Claire is there is deep love and mutual respect, but the way they achieve this is by operating on a completely different set of rules than the rest of us typically do."

Nancy deWolf Smith of The Wall Street Journal describes Claire as "a short-haired blonde who manages to be masculine and demasculinizing at the same time." Smith describes their relationship as pivotal to the show: "Benign though they may seem—and their harmless air is what makes the Underwoods so effective as political plotters—this is a power couple with the same malignant chemistry as pairs of serial killers, where each needs the other in order to become lethal".

Upon viewing a four-episode preview of season 2, Tim Goodman of The Hollywood Reporter says the series "sells husband and wife power-at-all-costs couple Frank (Kevin Spacey) and Claire (Robin Wright) Underwood as a little too oily and reptilian for anyone's good." Los Angeles Times critic Mary McNamara makes the case that House of Cards is a love story on many levels but most importantly between Frank and Claire.

In season 3, when the Underwoods are President and First Lady of the United States, Claire's marriage to Frank begins to falter. She tires of being in a subordinate role to him, wanting to be "significant" in her own right, and decides that he is "not enough" for her. She leaves him in the season finale but comes back in the fourth season, treating their marriage as a purely political arrangement to further her own career. When he is shot during a campaign event, Claire privately admits that she feels nothing for him. Throughout the season, she works behind the scenes to undermine Frank's election campaign, before finally joining forces with him in order to become his vice president. She also has an affair with her speechwriter Tom Yates (Paul Sparks), with Frank's approval.

Prior to Spacey's departure from the series, season 6 was going to center on a divorce battle between Frank and Claire, with the two attempting to destroy each other; after Spacey was fired, however, the season's story arc was drastically rewritten. The new season plot had Frank dying offscreen, and Claire—now the president—publicly distancing herself from him, and privately calling him her "biggest regret". Later in the season, she reveals that she is pregnant with his child.

== Fictional character biography ==
=== Season 1 ===
Claire is the CEO of an environmental group while serving as her husband's primary accomplice. After President Garrett Walker (Michel Gill) goes back on his promise to make Frank Secretary of State, Frank enlists Claire to help him get revenge and propel them both to positions of power. She and Frank scheme nightly over a cigarette, and together they maneuver their way into Walker's inner circle. Frank says of Claire: "I love that woman, I love her more than sharks love blood."

Claire is aware of Frank's sexual relationship with reporter Zoe Barnes (Kate Mara) and approves of it as long as it achieves their ends. She herself has an affair with an old boyfriend, Adam Galloway (Ben Daniels).

By the end of the season, Walker appoints Frank the Vice President of the United States, making Claire the Second Lady of the United States.

=== Season 2 ===
Claire's main storyline in season 2 is her advocacy, as Second Lady, for a sexual assault prevention bill. During her campaign for the bill, a secret from her college days emerges: during a nationally televised interview, she admits that she was raped in college and that her rapist, Dalton McGinnis (Peter Bradbury), is now a high-ranking general. (She had earlier had an uncomfortable encounter with McGinnis at a White House dinner, during which she had told Frank what the general had done to her.) She also admits to having aborted a pregnancy that she claims was the result of the rape; it is later revealed that she in fact aborted Frank's child, with his consent. She then converts the focus on that issue into political support that becomes critical to the Underwoods' ascension to the Oval Office.

Claire becomes increasingly ruthless as the season progresses. When Galloway leaks an intimate photo of Claire to appease his jealous fiancée, Claire intimidates him into publicly stating that he fabricated the picture, ruining his reputation. When Gillian Cole (Sandrine Holt), a pregnant former employee, returns to demand health care as part of her severance, Claire says, "I am willing to let your child wither and die inside you, if that's what's required, ... Am I really the sort of enemy you want to make?" Claire also manipulates First Lady Patricia Walker (Joanna Going) into believing that her husband is having an affair in order to distract President Walker from Frank's machinations.

She shows remorse for her actions only once. When another of McGinnis' victims, Megan Hennessy (Libby Woodbridge), comes forward, Claire uses her as the poster girl for the sexual assault bill, leaving the fragile young woman open to public scrutiny and reprisals from the bill's opponents. Before she can testify about her ordeal before Congress, however, Megan suffers a breakdown and attempts suicide. Upon realizing what she has caused Megan to go through, Claire bursts into tears.

In the season finale, she urges Frank to humble himself before President Walker, with whom he has fallen out of favor, in order to complete the plan: "Cut out your heart and put it in his fucking hands." The gambit works: Walker keeps Frank as his Vice President, allowing Frank to succeed him when he resigns. Frank is now President of the United States, with Claire as the First Lady.

According to Drew Grant of The New York Observer, Claire's season-long storyline was similar to the real life efforts of United States Senator Kirsten Gillibrand's to legislate an end to military sexual assault. Based upon the 4-episode preview, Alessandra Stanley of The New York Times says that in season 2 Claire "is still ruthlessly pursuing her own agenda as well as her husband's. She remains an enigma even as she reveals more and more disturbing secrets from her past." Claire remains composed and stylish with or without her husband and manipulates the press with aplomb.

=== Season 3 ===
In Season 3, Claire feels the need to be something more "significant" than the First Lady, and asks Frank to nominate her to a United Nations post. He nominates her, but the Senate rejects her after a rocky hearing. Frank gives her the job anyway in a recess appointment, but her tenure is brief; she ruins a treaty between the U.S. and Russia by publicly confronting Russian President Viktor Petrov (Lars Mikkelsen) about his anti-gay policies and is forced to resign when Petrov uses her as a bargaining chip during a diplomatic crisis.

During Frank's election campaign, Claire begins to question whether she still loves him. In the season finale, she and Frank get into an ugly fight in which she says he is not enough for her; Frank replies that without him, she is nothing. Season three ends with Claire leaving Frank as he prepares to go to the New Hampshire primary.

=== Season 4 ===
After leaving Frank, Claire goes back to Texas, where she has a tense reunion with her mother, who is dying of lymphoma. She sets her sights on running for a House of Representatives seat in Texas, with help from political consultant LeAnn Harvey (Neve Campbell). Frank persuades her to resume public appearances with him by promising to support her run. However, he sandbags her prospective candidacy by endorsing a political ally's daughter, in order to keep Claire focused on his campaign. Claire retaliates on the day of the South Carolina primary by covertly leaking a photo of Frank's father with a Klansman, imperiling Frank's candidacy. Frank figures out that she was behind the leak and confronts her. Claire calmly admits what she did and proposes that she join him in the ticket as his vice president. Frank rejects the idea.

Shortly thereafter, Frank is shot by Lucas Goodwin (Sebastian Arcelus), in an assassination attempt, and falls into a coma. While Frank is in surgery, Claire helps guide Frank's weak vice president Donald Blythe (Reed Birney) through a diplomatic crisis with Russia. While Frank is receiving a liver transplant, she declines going to the hospital in favor of negotiating a treaty with Petrov, and strong-arms him into accepting the U.S.' terms. When Frank recovers from surgery, he agrees to let Claire be his vice president. He and Claire advocate for a controversial gun control bill for the sole purpose of creating an atmosphere divisive enough to pick off the potential running mates. In the ensuing open convention, they publicly endorse Secretary of State Catherine Durant (Jayne Atkinson) for the job, while working behind the scenes to undermine her and ensure that Claire wins enough delegates to be nominated. Meanwhile, she reluctantly honors her mother's request to kill her. She and Frank then use the public sympathy from Elizabeth's death to win the nomination; they are now running mates.

When the terrorist group Islamic Caliphate Organization (ICO) takes an American family hostage, Claire negotiates with their imprisoned leader, Yusuf Al Ahmadi (Farshad Farahat), who agrees to tell his followers to release the hostages. Al Ahmadi reneges on the deal, however, and tells them to kill the hostages. At the same time, journalist Tom Hammerschmidt (Boris McGiver) publishes an investigative news story detailing Frank's crimes. Claire gives Frank the idea to declare war on ICO and allow the public to see the hostage die in order to distract from the scandal and create an atmosphere of widespread fear that they can exploit.

=== Season 5 ===
In season 5, Claire's story begins as the opening scene of the season: shooting a propaganda commercial in order to stir up fear. Throughout the beginning, she helps make the campaign's focal point about the fear of ICO and how they can stop the threat.

On Election Day, Claire and Frank learn that they may lose because of low voter turnout. They exploit a possible terrorist threat to close down multiple polling centers in key states, such as Ohio. This leads to numerous states filing lawsuits and refusing to honor the election results.

Nine weeks later, with neither side winning the majority of electors, the House (now Republican-controlled) will decide the President and the Senate (Democrat-controlled) for the Vice President, the first instance of this happening for the President since the 1824 presidential election and the first time for the Vice President since the 1836 presidential election. Claire eventually wins when Blythe issues a bill to block any filibuster in the Senate; while the House cannot reach a majority. In the meantime, Claire is sworn in as Acting President of the United States and begins to exert her limited power by excluding Frank from certain presidential functions, such as the swearing-in of the new Justice of the Supreme Court.

During her short-lived presidency, a truck carrying nuclear material goes missing and puts D.C. into lock-down, a scheme devised by several members of Frank's cabinet and Conway's campaign. During the emergency, Claire is visited by diplomat Jane Davis (Patricia Clarkson), who says that she can track down a leader of ICO for the Underwoods. Claire is also faced with a series of diplomatic crises: Russian soldiers have taken over an American base, and the Russians and Chinese are vying for possession of a boat in Antarctica that has a stowaway American working for the Russians. After making a deal with the Chinese, Claire orders for the boat to be destroyed so that neither the Chinese nor the Russians can get what is on board. Around this time, Claire agrees to an open election in Ohio for not only the President, but also the Vice President, in order to avoid a possible Conway-Underwood administration.

Frank acquires a recording of Conway verbally abusing a pilot, as well as a recording of Conway's running mate, General Ted Brockhart (Colm Feore), threatening to kill Frank, which Frank and Claire use to blackmail Conway's campaign manager Mark Usher (Campbell Scott) into helping them; they then release the tapes anyway. Voters turn against Conway, and the Underwoods win the election.

Soon afterward, Congressman Alex Romero (James Martinez) encourages Republicans in the House to start up the Declaration of War committee to investigate Frank, which puts Claire and Frank in damage control.

By this time, Claire and Yates have fallen in love, which complicates both their lives. During an unguarded moment, Claire tells Yates that Frank murdered Zoe Barnes and Congressman Peter Russo (Corey Stoll). She immediately regrets it, and tells Yates that they can't see each other anymore. In response, Yates threatens to publish a book detailing the Underwoods' crimes. Claire invites him to Usher's home, and poisons him. He dies while having sex with Claire, and she has Usher get rid of the body. Around this time, Claire and Frank convince Stamper to take the fall for Zoe Barnes' death. Frank also starts to become suspicious of Claire as she disappears for a period of time (she had started talking to Davis in a secret corridor) and starts to memorize her testimony defending herself but not Frank, in case she has to testify.

Walker publicly testifies against Frank, prompting him to appear before the committee and resign the presidency. When an incredulous Claire confronts him, Frank says that it was his plan all along to resign and set her up to be president, so that the two of them can run Washington together—she from the White House and he from the private sector. For the plan to work, however, Claire must pardon Frank, which would damage her politically. Frank resigns and Claire is sworn in as the 47th President of the United States.

However, Claire does not announce that she is pardoning Frank in her first address to the nation as President. Frank calls her repeatedly, but she forwards the calls. She sees that Frank has burned a hole into the American flag in the Oval Office, and breaks the fourth wall, saying: "My turn."

=== Season 6 ===
The sixth season begins four months later. Claire is President, with Usher as her Vice President. Frank has died of an apparent heart attack, but Claire suspects that he may have been murdered. Throughout the season, she tries to disassociate herself from Frank, returning to her maiden name and calling him "my biggest regret". She makes enemies of Bill Shepherd (Greg Kinnear) and his sister Annette (Diane Lane), two political power brokers who oppose her agenda. As she returns to the White House from giving a speech, an attempt is made on her life; a disgruntled ex-soldier shoots at her motorcade and commits suicide.

Claire also faces a threat in Stamper, who recants his confession and makes a deal with federal prosecutors to give them Claire as revenge for her turning her back on him and Frank. She makes a shaky alliance with him, however, by promising to protect him in return for his help getting rid of Durant, who she fears will testify against her regarding her and Frank's crimes. Days later, Claire pardons Stamper, and Durant apparently dies of an embolism; it is later revealed, however, that she faked her death and fled the country.

Meanwhile, Claire grows suspicious of Usher, who is secretly working with the Shepherds. She fires her cabinet to neutralize his influence, and leaks information tying him and Bill Shepherd to laundering money for the Russian government; she also punishes Annette Shepherd by revealing to the press that Annette's son, Duncan (Cody Fern), is in fact the biological child of one of her serving staff. To clear the field of potential threats to her power, Claire has Durant, Davis and Hammerschmidt killed. When Stamper confronts her about what Frank left him in his will, Claire says that she is pregnant with Frank's child. The Shepherds try to undermine her by developing a voting app that would essentially steal the upcoming midterm elections; Claire retaliates by having Duncan, who created the app, arrested for treason.

In the series finale, Claire arranges a meeting with Stamper, who she suspects has been hired by the Shepherds to kill her. During a heated exchange, she gets him to confess that he poisoned Frank in order to stop him from killing her, in order to protect the Underwood "legacy". He attacks her with a letter opener, superficially wounding her in the throat, but cannot bring himself to kill her, instead collapsing into her arms. Claire grabs the letter opener and stabs him in the stomach. As he lies bleeding on the floor, she covers his mouth and suffocates him, completely unaware that, thanks to Doug, journalist Janine Skorsky is going to expose her crimes.

== Reception ==
Wright's performance is described as "nuanced and compelling". Claire has "chilly poise" but the "coolly regal doyenne" softens over the course of the first season according to New Republic's Laura Bennet. Wright plays the role with "an almost terrifying froideur". As a couple Frank and Claire are said to "reverberate with tension and wit". Michael Dobbs, who wrote the trilogy of novels upon which the British miniseries is based, compares the compelling nature of the relationship between Frank and Claire favorably to the original characters in House of Cards and likens them to Macbeth and Lady Macbeth. He is not alone. In season 2, she remains "equally steely". Despite suggestions to the contrary, Wright insists that the character is not based on Hillary Clinton.

=== Awards and nominations ===
On July 18, 2013, Netflix earned the first Primetime Emmy Award nominations for original online only streaming television for the 65th Primetime Emmy Awards. Three of its web series, Arrested Development, Hemlock Grove, and House of Cards, earned nominations. Among those nominations was Wright's portrayal of Claire Underwood for Outstanding Lead Actress in a Drama Series as well as Kevin Spacey's portrayal of Frank Underwood for Outstanding Lead Actor in a Drama Series and Jason Bateman's portrayal of Michael Bluth in Arrested Development for Outstanding Lead Actor in a Comedy Series, making these three roles the first three leading roles to be Primetime Emmy Award-nominated from a streaming television series. The role has also earned Golden Globe Award for Best Actress – Television Series Drama award at the 71st Golden Globe Awards on January 12, 2014. In so doing she became the first actress to win a Golden Globe Award for an online-only streaming television series.

For season 2, Wright earned a Critics' Choice Television Award for Best Actress in a Drama Series nomination at the 4th Critics' Choice Television Awards. Wright was again nominated for Primetime Emmy Award for Outstanding Lead Actress in a Drama Series at the 66th Primetime Emmy Awards and Best Actress – Television Series Drama at the 72nd Golden Globe Awards. She was nominated for both Outstanding Performance by a Female Actor in a Drama Series and Outstanding Performance by an Ensemble in a Drama Series at the 21st Screen Actors Guild Awards.

In season 3, she was nominated for Primetime Emmy Award for Outstanding Lead Actress in a Drama Series at the 67th Primetime Emmy Awards, Best Actress – Television Series Drama at the 73rd Golden Globe Awards, as well as both Outstanding Performance by a Female Actor in a Drama Series and Outstanding Performance by an Ensemble in a Drama Series at the 22nd Screen Actors Guild Awards.

Her performance in season 4 earned her a nomination for Primetime Emmy Award for Outstanding Lead Actress in a Drama Series at the 68th Primetime Emmy Awards. Wright continued to receive another individual Screen Actors Guild Award at the 23rd Screen Actors Guild Awards, and a nomination at the 7th Critics' Choice Television Awards for Best Actress in a Drama Series.

Wright's performance in season 5 earned her a fifth consecutive Primetime Emmy nomination at the 69th Primetime Emmy Awards. She continued to be the show's only nominations at the 24th Screen Actors Guild Awards and the 8th Critics' Choice Television Awards, both hosted in early 2018.

For her final performance in season 6, Wright received her fifth individual (and seventh overall throughout the series) consecutive nomination at the 25th Screen Actors Guild Awards. She later went on to receive her sixth and final nomination for the role for the Lead Actress in a Drama Series Emmy at the 71st Primetime Emmy Awards. She became one of only seven actresses that received six or more nominations in the category for the same show.
