= Nathan Darrow =

American actor

- Born: 1976 or 1977 (age 49–50); Kansas City, Missouri, U.S.
- Education: University of Evansville (BFA); New York University (MFA)
- Occupation: Actor

Nathan Darrow (born 1976 or 1977) is an American actor known for his role as Secret Service agent Edward Meechum in House of Cards, John Custer in Preacher, Mick Danzig in Billions, Andrew Madoff in The Wizard of Lies, and as Victor Fries/Mr. Freeze in Gotham.

== Early life ==
Darrow was born in Kansas City, Missouri. After attending Shawnee Mission North High School in Overland Park, Kansas, he earned his bachelor's degree from University of Evansville and attended graduate school at New York University.

== Career ==
In 2003, Darrow returned to Kansas City, and performed in productions of Shakespeare's plays, including Romeo and Juliet and Henry V. In 2006, he played young William Randolf Hearst in Don Maxwell's Ambrose Bierce: Civil War Stories, which also starred Campbell Scott and Vivian Schilling. A role in a touring production of Richard III with Kevin Spacey led to casting in the role of Meechum, the Underwoods' stoic bodyguard in House of Cards. Darrow's role was expanded in Season Two, as the character of Meechum had been well received by critics and audiences. Darrow appeared as Ben Farrell in The Stolen Chair Theatre Company's film noir for the stage, Kill Me Like You Mean It, at the 4th St Theatre in New York City. He appeared at Princeton's McCarter Theatre in Rachel Bonds' Five Mile Lake, May 1–31, 2015, directed by Emily Mann. He also starred in the Southern Shakespeare Company's production of The Winters Tale in May 2024.

It was announced that Darrow would appear in the second season of the Fox television series Gotham as Victor Fries/Mr. Freeze.

He has a recurring role in the first season of Billions, and returns in the third season going onward. He is set to appear in the fourth and final season of Rectify. He also appears as Jesse Custer's father in the AMC television series Preacher and as Jonathan Grimm in the NBC series The Blacklist. He plays Andrew Madoff in HBO's The Wizard of Lies (2017). He starred in the third season of the ABC thriller Quantico as Felix Pillay.
