= Elizabeth Norment =

American actress

- Born: Elizabeth Larrabee Norment; December 31, 1952; Washington, District of Columbia, U.S.
- Died: October 13, 2014 (aged 61); New York City, U.S.
- Occupation: Actress
- Years active: 1984–2014

Elizabeth Larrabee Norment (December 31, 1952 – October 13, 2014) was an American actress best known for her role as Nancy Kaufberger in the Netflix series House of Cards. She attended Yale University, and had performed in several theater roles before moving into television.

== Career ==
Norment went to southern California in 1983 to star in Beethoven's Tenth at the Ahmanson Theatre in Los Angeles. She remained there after the production ended. She had bit parts in films, made TV commercials, and appeared in some TV programs. She also continued to act on stage.

She died of cancer on October 13, 2014, at Memorial Sloan Kettering Cancer Center in New York City, aged 61.

== Filmography ==
=== Film ===
Year	Title	Role	Notes
1984	The Woman in Red	Hairdresser	
1984	Runaway	Miss Shields	
1988	Too Good to Be True	Unknown	Television movie
1989	The Final Days	Jill Volner	Television movie
1994	Higher Education	Ann	Television movie
1996	Co-Ed Call Girl	Vivian Stone	
1997	Romy and Michele's High School Reunion	Irate Customer	
1997	Murder in Mind	Dr. Beck	

=== Television ===
Year	Title	Role	Notes
1985	Robert Kennedy & His Times	Eunice Kennedy	3 episodes
1985	The Twilight Zone	Ruth Jordan	1 episode ("Examination Day/A Message from Charity")
1986	St. Elsewhere	Elaine Geyer	1 episode ("Russian Roulette")
1987	L.A. Law	Estelle Friedman	1 episode ("December Bribe")
1988	Hooperman	Unknown	1 episode ("Baby on Board")
1990	Mancuso, F.B.I.	Carrie Carter	1 episode ("Daryl Ross & The Supremes")
1991-1992	Doogie Howser, M.D.	Nancy Stewart	2 episodes ("It's a Damn Shaman" [1991], "Educating Janine" [1992])
1992	Mad About You	Female Passenger	1 episode ("Token Friend")
1994	Higher Education	Ann	4 episodes
1995	The Marshal	Federal Judge Leigh Wilder	1 episode ("Protection")
1995	ER	Mrs. Sandburg	1 episode ("Motherhood")
1995	Party of Five	Doctor / Dr. Sullivan	2 episodes ("Grand Delusions" [1995], "Before and After" [1996])
1996	Sisters	Helen Swann	1 episode ("Leap Before You Look")
1997	Nothing Sacred	Beverly	1 episode ("Song of Songs")
1999	L.A. Doctors	Caroline's Doctor	1 episode ("Oh Captain My Captain")
2002-2008	Law & Order	Judge Arlene Brewer	3 episodes ("Equal Rights" [2002], "Caviar Emptor" [2004], "Bottomless" [2008])
2006	Law & Order: Special Victims Unit	Bursar	1 episode ("Class")
2008	All My Children	Psychologist	1 episode
2012	Political Animals	Rachel Silverton	Miniseries. 1 episode ("The Woman Problem")
2013	Blue Bloods	Gail Holt	1 episode ("No Regrets")
2013–2014	House of Cards	Nancy Kaufberger	14 episodes (Season 3 was released posthumously)

== Theater credits ==
Founding member, American Repertory Theatre, Cambridge MA

New York credits: http://www.lortel.org/Archives/CreditableEntity/12020
