= Michel Gill =

American actor

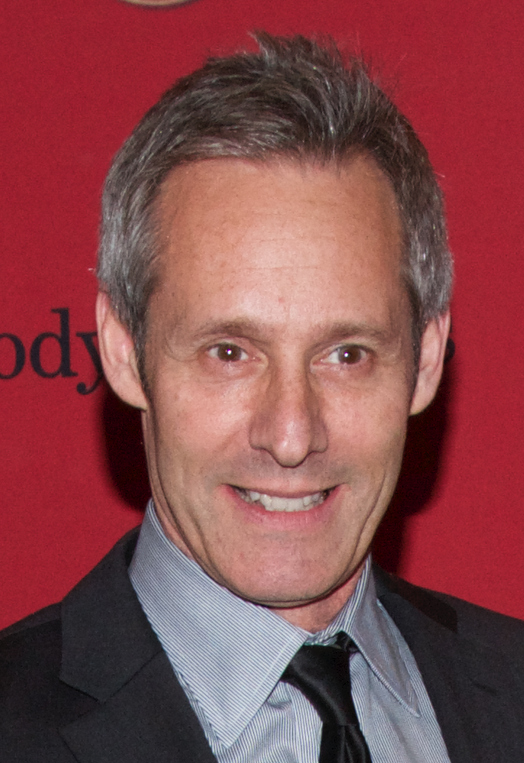
- Gill in 2014
- Born: April 16, 1960 (age 66)
- Other name: Michael Gill
- Education: Tufts University (attended); Juilliard School (BFA)
- Spouse: Jayne Atkinson (m. 1998)
- Children: 1

Michel Gill (born April 16, 1960), also known as Michael Gill, is an American actor best known for playing President Garrett Walker in the Netflix series House of Cards and Gideon Goddard on Mr. Robot.

== Early life ==
Gill is a first generation American born to Jewish parents who escaped the Holocaust. Gill's first language was French. He studied at Aiglon College, a prestigious boarding school in Switzerland. After Aiglon, he attended Tufts University before transferring and graduating from the Juilliard School in 1985 (Group 14).

== Personal life ==
Gill is married to fellow House of Cards actor Jayne Atkinson (Secretary of State Catherine Durant), whom he met when they were both in a production of The Heiress at the Long Wharf Theatre in New Haven, Connecticut.

They began dating in 1992 and were married in 1998. Gill and Atkinson reside with their son in the Berkshires.

== Filmography ==
=== Film ===
Year	Title	Role	Notes
1984	Protocol	College Boy	Uncredited
1990	The Palmero Connection	—N/a	
2013	Afflicted	—N/a	
2014	Dangerous Liaisons	Derek Walker	Television movie
2015	Everything	Dr. Fisk	Short film
2015	Condemned	Senior CDC Agent	
2016	Who Killed JonBenét?	John Ramsey	Television movie
2018	Patient 001	Alec	

=== Television ===
Year	Title	Role	Notes
2003	Law & Order: Criminal Intent	Spencer Anderson	Episode: "Gemini"
2010	All My Children	Dr. Hawkins	2 episodes
2013	The Good Wife	Frederick Plunkett	Episode: "Je Ne Sais What?"
2013–2017	House of Cards	President Garrett Walker	25 episodes
2014	Person of Interest	Rene Lapointe	Episode: "Allegiance"
2015	Forever	Dmitry Malakoff	Episode: Best Foot Forward
2015–2017	Mr. Robot	Gideon Goddard	11 episodes
2016–2017	The Get Down	Herbert Gunns	7 episodes
2017	Ray Donovan	Doug Landry	6 episodes
2018	Chicago Med	Robert Haywood	9 episodes
2019	God Friended Me	Wilson Hedges	3 episodes
2021	Nova Vita	Anthony Nixon	10 episodes
2022	The Gilded Age	Patrick Morris	2 episodes
2022	The Dropout	Chris Holmes	6 episodes

== Awards and nominations ==
Year	Association	Category	Nominated work	Result	Notes
2014	Screen Actors Guild Award	Outstanding Performance by an Ensemble in a Drama Series	House of Cards	Nominated	
