= Kristen Connolly =

American actress (born 1980)

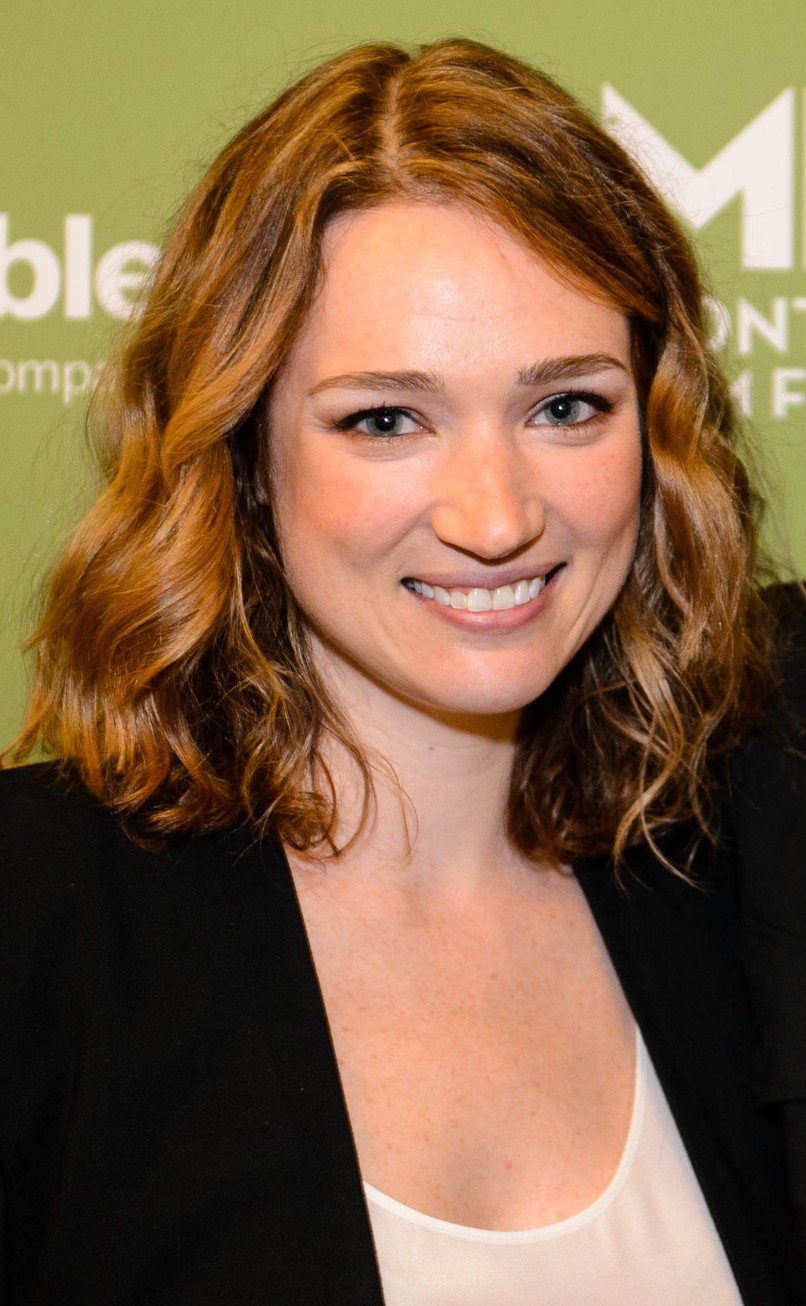
- Connolly in 2014
- Born: July 12, 1980 (age 45); Montclair, New Jersey, U.S.
- Occupation: Actress
- Years active: 2003–present
- Spouse: Stephen O'Reilly
- Children: 2

Kristen Connolly (born July 12, 1980) is an American actress. She is known for her roles as Dana Polk in the 2011 film The Cabin in the Woods, Christina Gallagher on the Netflix series House of Cards and Jamie Campbell on the CBS series Zoo.

== Career ==
Connolly began her career with recurring roles on several CollegeHumor digital shorts. She appeared as an extra on the films Mona Lisa Smile, Meet Dave, and The Happening. She has also appeared on two CBS daytime soap operas with recurring roles on Guiding Light and As the World Turns.

She first gained mainstream recognition in 2012, after starring as the main protagonist Dana in the Joss Whedon/Drew Goddard film The Cabin in the Woods. She also starred in the horror film The Bay. In 2013, she had a starring role as Christina Gallagher on the Netflix series House of Cards. On September 1, 2014 the A&E Houdini miniseries premiered with 3.7 million viewers, Connolly plays Bess Houdini with Academy Award-winning Adrien Brody playing Harry Houdini. Connolly also portrayed Jamie, a passionate journalist in the CBS drama-thriller series Zoo and co-starred as Lena in the drama series The Whispers. In 2014 she portrayed Petra Anderson in the drama thriller film A Good Marriage, based on Stephen King's short story of the same name.

== Personal life ==
Connolly was born and raised in Montclair, New Jersey. She is married to Stephen O'Reilly, with whom she has two children.

== Filmography ==
=== Film ===
Year	Title	Role	Notes
2003	Mona Lisa Smile	Art History Student	
2008	Revolutionary Road	Mrs. Brace	
2008	The Happening	Woman Reading on the Bench	
2008	Meet Dave	Make-Out Girl	
2009	Confessions of a Shopaholic	Woman Who Wins Green Scarf Bid	
2011	The Five Stages of Grief	Allison	Short Film
2012	The Bay	Stephanie	
2012	The Cabin in the Woods	Dana Polk	
2012	Ex-Girlfriends	Laura	
2014	A Good Marriage	Petra Anderson	
2014	Worst Friends	Zoe	
2022	Deep Water	Kelly Wilson	
2025	Honey Don't!	Heidi O’Donahue	

=== Television ===
Year	Title	Role	Notes
2008	New Amsterdam	Fanny	Episode: "Honor"
2008	Guiding Light	Jolene	16 episodes
2008	Law & Order: Criminal Intent	Miranda/Teresa	Episode: "Vanishing Act"
2008–09	As the World Turns	Josie Anderson	39 episodes
2009	Life on Mars	Donna	Episode: "Let All the Children Boogie"
2009	Nurse Jackie	Mrs. Vogal	Episode: "School Nurse"
2009	Mercy	Carey Whitlow	Episode: "You Lose Me with the Cinderblock"
2010	Superego	Josey	Television movie
2011	The Good Wife	Maggie Reeves	Episode: "Get a Room"
2013–14	House of Cards	Christina Gallagher	17 episodes
2014	Houdini	Bess Houdini	2 episodes
2015	The Whispers	Lena Lawrence	10 episodes
2015–17	Zoo	Jamie Campbell	39 episodes
2017	The Wizard of Lies	Stephanie Madoff	Television film
2019–21	Evil	Mira Byrd	5 episodes
2019	Prodigal Son	Beth Saverstein	Episode: "Pied-A-Terre"
2022	Outer Range	Rebecca Abbott	3 episodes
2022	Law & Order: Special Victims Unit	Audrey O'Neill	Episode: "Confess Your Sins to Be Free"
2023	Accused	Natalie Barnes	Episode: "Robyn's Story"
2023–24	FBI: International	Olivia Thornton	2 episodes
2025	The Summer I Turned Pretty	Lucinda Jewel	Main role; season three
