= Boris McGiver =

American actor (born 1962)

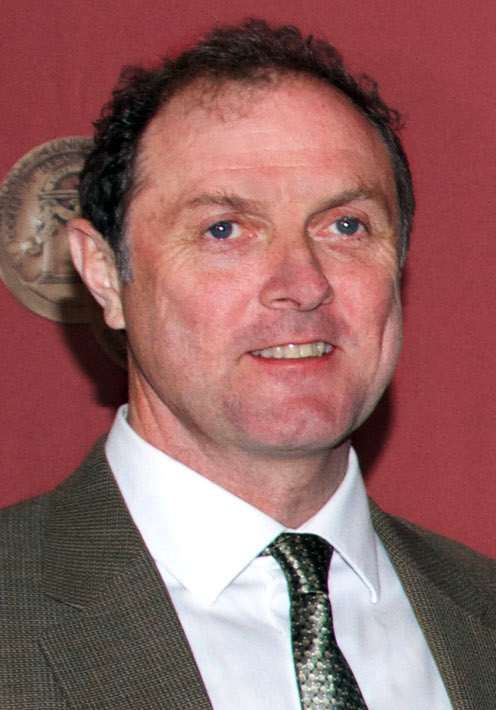
- McGiver in 2014
- Born: January 23, 1962 (age 64)
- Education: University at Albany; New York University
- Occupation: Actor
- Years active: 1987–present
- Father: John McGiver

Boris McGiver (born January 23, 1962) is an American actor. He is known for his roles in projects such as Lincoln, House of Cards, The Wire, Killing Kennedy, and Person of Interest.

== Biography ==
McGiver is the son of actor John McGiver. In 1979, he graduated from Middleburgh High School in Middleburgh, New York, before attending the University at Albany and then New York University, where he earned a master's degree in acting. He was not initially eager to follow in his father's footsteps: "I kind of denied it [acting] throughout my childhood because my dad was an actor and he was never around. He had to feed 10 kids, he was always working, so to me acting was never connected to something good, and I had never realized what an art it was. I thought it was just playtime."

== Filmography ==
=== Film ===
Year	Title	Role	Notes
1987	Ironweed	Clerk	
1990	Antigone/Rites of Passion	Guard	
1994	Little Odessa	Ivan	
2004	Connie and Carla	Tibor	
2004	Taxi	Franklin	
2006	The Pink Panther	Vainqueur	Uncredited
2007	Dark Matter	Reverend Hollings	
2008	The Clique	Issac	Direct to video
2012	Lincoln	Alexander Hamilton Coffroth	
2013	Killing Kennedy	John W. Fain	Television film
2019	Point Blank	Masterson	

=== Television ===
Year	Title	Role	Notes
1992	Law & Order	Alan	Episode: "Forgiveness"
1993	Law & Order	Desk Clerk	Episode: "Discord"
1998	New York Undercover	Sodovsky	Episode: "Pipeline"
1998	Trinity	Carl Checkik	Episode: "Pilot"
2001	As the World Turns	Dr. Early	Episode: "#1.11437"
2004	Law & Order	Hjalmar Forskerskoler	Episode: "Coming Home Hard"
2005	Rescue Me	Captain Bob Kent	Episode: "Sensitivity"
2005	Law & Order: Criminal Intent	Larry Chapel	Episode: "Grow"
2006	The Wire	Charles Marimow	6 episodes
2007	30 Rock	Patrick Donaghy	Episode: "The Fighting Irish"
2008	John Adams	Robert Goddard	Episode: "Join or Die"
2009	Law & Order	Jerry Gans	Episode: "Fed"
2010	The Good Wife	Eric Dorfman	Episode: "Fleas"
2012	Damages	Killer	2 episodes
2012–14	Person of Interest	George Hersh	13 episodes
2013	The Carrie Diaries	Eddie Lander	2 episodes
2013	White Collar	Section Chief Bruce Hawes	2 episodes
2013	Blue Bloods	Trevor Holt	Episode: "No Regrets"
2013–18	House of Cards	Tom Hammerschmidt	30 episodes
2014	Turn: Washington's Spies	Reverend Nathaniel Tallmadge	2 episodes
2014	Boardwalk Empire	Sheriff Peter Lindsay	6 episodes
2015	Forever	Sheriff Vance	Episode: "The Night in Question"
2015	Flesh and Bone	Maxwell Kensington	Episode: "Reconnaissance"
2016	Crisis in Six Scenes	Sy	Episode: "Episode 6"
2017	The Blacklist	Tobias Reuther	Episode: "Ilyas Surkov"
2019–23	Servant	Uncle George	11 episodes
2019–24	Evil	Monsignor Matthew Korecki	16 episodes
2020	For Life	Glen Maskins	14 episodes
2022	Our Flag Means Death	Father Bonnet	4 episodes
2022	The First Lady	Morley Safer	Episode: "That White House"
2024	Teacup	Donald Kelly	7 episodes
