= House of Cards season 5 =

Season of the American television drama series House of Cards

House of Cards
- Season 5
- Blu-ray cover
- Showrunners: Melissa James Gibson; Frank Pugliese
- Starring: Kevin Spacey; Robin Wright; Michael Kelly; Boris McGiver; Jayne Atkinson; Derek Cecil; Paul Sparks; Neve Campbell; Joel Kinnaman; Campbell Scott; Dominique McElligott; Korey Jackson; Damian Young; James Martinez; Patricia Clarkson
- No. of episodes: 13

Release
- Original network: Netflix
- Original release: May 30, 2017

Season chronology
- ← Previous; Season 4 Next → Season 6

The fifth season of House of Cards, an American political drama television series created by Beau Willimon for Netflix, was released on May 30, 2017. Frank Pugliese and Melissa James Gibson took over as showrunners in place of Willimon, who departed the series. The fifth season follows Frank and Claire Underwood (Kevin Spacey and Robin Wright) and their attempt to win the 2016 presidential election against Republican Party nominee Will Conway (Joel Kinnaman). The Underwoods are also faced with mounting insubordination from staff and congressional colleagues as the threat of impeachment looms.

Following a series of sexual misconduct allegations made against Kevin Spacey in October 2017, Netflix fired the actor, making the fifth season his final appearance in the series. It consists of 13 episodes and was followed up by a final sixth season released in 2018.

== Production ==
Casting began for the season on June 17, 2016. Filming had begun by July 20, 2016, and finished by February 14, 2017.

On January 28, 2016, Netflix renewed House of Cards for a fifth season. It was also announced that series creator Beau Willimon would step down as showrunner following the fourth season. It was announced in February 2016 that Melissa James Gibson and Frank Pugliese, who both joined the show in the third season, would serve as co-showrunners for the fifth season. In October 2016, it was announced that Patricia Clarkson and Campbell Scott had been cast for the fifth season. The first trailer for the season was released on May 1, 2017. The season was released on May 30, 2017.

== Cast ==
- Kevin Spacey as Francis J. Underwood, the President of the United States
- Robin Wright as Claire Underwood, First Lady of the United States, former United States Ambassador to the United Nations, Democratic vice presidential nominee, Vice President of the United States and the President of the United States
- Michael Kelly as Douglas "Doug" Stamper, the White House Chief of Staff
- Campbell Scott as Mark Usher, top-level Republican campaign adviser and strategist
- Patricia Clarkson as Jane Davis, Deputy Under Secretary of Commerce for International Trade
- Paul Sparks as Thomas Yates, speechwriter and Claire Underwood's lover
- Derek Cecil as Seth Grayson, the White House Press Secretary
- Neve Campbell as LeAnn Harvey, a Texas-based political consultant, the Underwood campaign manager
- Joel Kinnaman as Will Conway, the Republican nominee for president and Governor of New York
- Dominique McElligott as Hannah Conway, wife of New York Governor and Republican presidential nominee Will Conway
- Boris McGiver as Tom Hammerschmidt, an editor at The Washington Herald and Lucas Goodwin's former boss
- Korey Jackson as Sean Jeffries, a young reporter at The Washington Herald working under Hammerschmidt
- Jayne Atkinson as Catherine Durant, Secretary of State
- Colm Feore as General Ted Brockhart, Republican vice-presidential nominee
- Damian Young as Aidan Macallan, a data scientist and NSA contractor who is friends with LeAnn Harvey
- James Martinez as Alex Romero, a Democratic congressman from Arizona
- Michel Gill as Garrett Walker, the former President of the United States and Frank's predecessor
- Gerald McRaney as Raymond Tusk, former associate of President Walker's and Frank's adversary
- Larry Pine as Bob Birch, the House Minority Leader and a Democratic U.S. Representative from Michigan
- Curtiss Cook as Terry Womack, the House Minority Whip
- Lars Mikkelsen as Viktor Petrov, the President of the Russian Federation
- Wendy Moniz as Laura Moretti, widow of a liver transplant candidate
- Reed Birney as Donald Blythe, the Vice President of the United States
- Malcolm Madera as Eric Rawlings, a Civil War reenactor and personal trainer
- Kate Lyn Sheil as Lisa Williams, a girlfriend of Rachel Posner's before Rachel's death
- Jeremy Holm as Agent Nathan Green, the Deputy Director of the FBI
- Kim Dickens as Kate Baldwin, a journalist and former White House Correspondent for the Wall Street Telegraph
- Dan Ziskie as Jim Matthews, former Vice President of the United States and Governor of Pennsylvania.

== Episodes ==
No. overall	No. in season	Title	Directed by	Written by	Original release date	Prod. code
53	1	"Chapter 53"	Daniel Minahan	Frank Pugliese	May 30, 2017	HOC-501
Chaos erupts when President Frank Underwood commandeers the floor of the House and demands that Congress formally declare war on ICO. When the Speaker insists that Frank yield the floor, he insists that he "will not yield." Later, Frank and Claire attend James Miller's funeral, which is also attended by Republican nominee Will Conway and his wife. During the service, James' daughter blames Frank for her father's death. Claire appears on Charlie Rose to debate Tom Hammerschmidt, who claims that Frank's war on ICO is a diversion. Meanwhile, Conway goes into damage control when his wife claims that the mother of wanted ICO terrorist Josh Masterson is also a victim. Claire speaks with Ms. Masterson and asks that she tell her son to surrender. The manhunt for Masterson heats up as the FBI closes in on a location on the Virginia border. However, Frank has been holding Masterson captive in an unknown location and has him executed, informing the press that he "wishes" Masterson had been taken alive. Frank calls to speak with the Millers, but Jim's widow hangs up on him.
54	2	"Chapter 54"	Daniel Minahan	Melissa James Gibson	May 30, 2017	HOC-502
At an event in New York City, Claire is informed that one of Frank's old friends has gone missing and is presumed dead. Meanwhile, Frank hosts a luncheon of the nation's governors, seeking to gain the support of the governors from five critical swing states. Secretary of State Catherine Durant states her opposition to Frank's "war" on terror, while Donald Blythe believes it has helped Frank's poll numbers. Meanwhile, Aidan Macallan attempts to hack into a telecom switching center and delete everything that may implicate him and the Underwoods. As Aidan nervously awaits the file deletion, electronic devices around the Washington, D.C. area are affected in what Frank claims is an ICO cyber attack. He uses the incident to pressure Congress to accept his declaration of war. Meanwhile, Conway takes his kids trick-or-treating, but as the military mobilizes in response to the cyber attack he has an outburst on live television which Frank and Claire drink to.
55	3	"Chapter 55"	Alik Sakharov	John Mankiewicz	May 30, 2017	HOC-503
The day before the 2016 election, Conway holds a 24-hour livestream call-in with voters and is asked a question by someone who knows about his time in the military; Hannah insists that Will is too humble to discuss the topic. While Claire and Frank campaign together in Pennsylvania, Doug confronts Governor Jim Matthews for not following through with establishing voting centers or bringing in the National Guard. Back in D.C., Durant alerts Frank to a Syrian national with strong ICO connections named Mohammad Kalabi. With Conway getting all the publicity, Frank calls into the livestream and tells Conway that he can ask him any question he wants. Will asks why he was never given a chance to complete the mission and save James Miller after successfully negotiating the release of his wife and daughter; Frank says the terrorists could tell Conway was weak, meaning Frank had to step in and take control. Frank's last-minute call grabs the morning headlines. However, the Underwoods are given worrying news: voter turnout is unsettlingly low across the country. Frank, however, insists that they are not going anywhere.
56	4	"Chapter 56"	Alik Sakharov	Kenneth Lin	May 30, 2017	HOC-504
On Election Day, voter turnout for the Underwoods is low and the polls are working in Conway's favor. Frank calls the governor of Tennessee, where a polling station attack was staged in Knoxville, and says that the home of a suspected terrorist has been raided and a plot to bomb the state's polling stations has been uncovered, urging him to shut them down. A riot caused by a bomb-sniffing dog occurs at one polling station and injures several people. Frank convinces the governor to halt voting and declare a state of emergency. A curfew is enacted. Amid terrorist threats, the governor of Ohio calls Frank and says he is considering closing down polling stations as well, while Frank tells him not to, pretending that he does not want that to happen. After Conway wins Pennsylvania, Frank calls him to facetiously concede the election. Hours pass, and Conway is frustrated when Frank has yet to publicly announce his concession. The governor of Ohio eventually announces that he has closed the polls in his state due to the potential terror threat and that the results are not certifiable as a result. More states refuse to certify their election results as well, leaving the election contested.
57	5	"Chapter 57"	Michael Morris	Laura Eason	May 30, 2017	HOC-505
Nine weeks pass since the unresolved election, which will now be decided by a contingent election in the House. Despite Frank's approval rating falling to 19%, Claire says that they are done winning over the American people and must now win over Congress. Tom meets with Lisa Williams to discuss information regarding Doug, but he is hesitant to believe her. Frank tries to convince Democratic congressman Alex Romero to sway other House Democrats to vote for him. Aidan, who previously went missing, calls LeAnn to say that he will leak incriminating information on the Underwoods if she does not get the authorities off his back. While LeAnn manages to flip a vote from Maine, Doug fails to win New Hampshire. On the day of the vote, Claire asks Donald to prevent a filibuster and keep the House Republicans off the floor. When he refuses, Claire begins insulting him and his late wife. Neither Conway nor Frank receive the 26 votes in the House needed to win, meaning that the Senate's vice presidential selection between Claire and Conway's running mate, General Ted Brockhart, will assume the duties of the Presidency until the House votes again.
58	6	"Chapter 58"	Michael Morris	Bill Kennedy	May 30, 2017	HOC-506
Claire becomes Acting President of the United States. Frank congratulates her on the position, even if it is just for a few weeks. Durant informs the Underwoods that a research facility in Antarctica has been taken over by an unidentified military group, suspecting the Russians. Meanwhile, it appears that Aidan has been kidnapped and may be forced to reveal secrets. Mark Usher, Conway's campaign manager secures a meeting for Conway with the Congressional Black Caucus in the hopes that they will consider supporting him instead of Frank, but the meeting goes very poorly. On a private plane back to New York, an exasperated Conway finally cracks under the pressure and lashes out at Usher, then berates the pilots for not allowing him to fly the plane and declares maniacally that he will be President. Sean visits Lisa then tells Tom, who fires him after discovering that Sean looked through his notes. Tom later investigates the death of Zoe Barnes. To avoid a mixed-ticket White House, the Underwoods are able to convince Usher to support new elections in Ohio and Tennessee so long as the Speaker approves. Claire, Frank, and Durant learn it is the Russians who have kidnapped Aidan.
59	7	"Chapter 59"	Alik Sakharov	Tian Jun Gu	May 30, 2017	HOC-507
Claire and Frank are briefed in the Situation Room about the potential location of Ahmed Al Ahmadi, the leader of ICO. The generals believe Ahmed is in Damascus, but they are divided on how to approach the situation. Tom continues his investigation into Rachel Posner and her possible connection to Doug. Claire holds a meeting with Cathy and Jane Davis, but the three are moved to a bunker underground when a truck carrying radioactive material is missing. Doug calls LeAnn and Seth from the bunker, telling them to keep calm. Frank and Claire question Jane's security clearance. Doug informs Frank of a hot-mic recording where Brockhart says he would actively tell his troops to disobey orders if Frank put them on the borders of Syria. Frank leaves the bunker and accuses Brockhart of orchestrating a fake terrorist threat in order to make them evacuate D.C. and effectively stage a coup d'etat to sabotage his election; after Brockhart names the general behind the plot, the truck is "found". The general is forced to resign, but not before telling Claire that neither she nor her husband deserve to be in the White House. The next day, the Underwoods accuse Usher of being involved in the incident, playing the Brockhart audiotape. When Usher insists he stop, Frank says "it gets so much better".
60	8	"Chapter 60"	Roxann Dawson	John Mankiewicz	May 30, 2017	HOC-508
Frank attends an elite weekend retreat to firm up support for the upcoming elections in Ohio and Tennessee. Among the attendees are Usher, Brockhart, Raymond Tusk, and Benjamin Grant, the head of Pollyhop. Claire is awakened in the middle of the night and hurried into the Situation Room, informed that a Russian research vessel carrying 100 people is sinking in the Antarctic. The next morning, Frank and Brockhart chat about the Al Ahmadi situation. After negotiating trade deals with China, Jane reveals to Claire that they are willing to aid the rescue as there is an American aboard the Russian ship. Claire asks for proof of the American's presence before moving forward. In the woods, Frank contacts Doug and tells him that Brockhart is making a deal with Tusk. Frank remembers something that Tusk mentioned ("a little restraint would be unexpected") and tells Doug not to act on it. Claire plays hardball with China on the rescue operation and a trade deal. Though China is hesitant at first, the rescue mission goes through and China gets credit, but the lost American is not found. On his way out, Grant gives Frank a recording of Conway's tirade on the plane. The next day, Frank and Claire meet with Usher in the Oval Office and inform him of the recording. With that leverage, the Underwoods are able to recruit Usher, who advises them how to release the recording.
61	9	"Chapter 61"	Roxann Dawson	Bill Kennedy	May 30, 2017	HOC-509
After winning the Ohio election, Frank becomes President-elect of the United States. Frank offers Conway a menial position when he calls to concede, prompting Conway to curse him. Frank and Claire celebrate with champagne in the Oval Office. Doug believes it is unwise to allow LeAnn and Usher into the administration; Frank agrees that LeAnn's connection to Aidan is worrisome, but Usher should stay. Meanwhile, LeAnn has lunch with Kate Baldwin, revealing she is being kicked out because Aidan stole NSA files and might leak classified material in Russia. Yates informs Claire that he is finished being her speechwriter. Romero threatens the Underwoods, saying he will convince Congress to reopen the Declaration of War Committee to investigate them. He demands two seats on the dais at Frank's inauguration and a line in the inaugural address about Medicare. Frank is sworn in, but his address does not mention Romero or his concerns. Aidan unwillingly agrees to do an interview in Russia with Kate. However, he calls LeAnn, who tells him policemen have come to arrest him. During the inaugural ball, Frank and Eric Rawlings, the Civil War re-enactor and personal trainer, share a darkly intimate moment. In the halls of the West Wing, Frank tells Claire that Congress is reopening its investigation. As the party breaks up, Frank blackmails Yates and tells him not to cheat on Claire again. Meanwhile, Tom contacts Zoe's father, who reluctantly meets with him and says he had no idea that Zoe was in trouble. LeAnn, under the impression that giving up Aidan would save her job, is shocked when Doug fires her. In the Oval Office, Claire and Frank meet with Jane. Frank says he wants Aidan back on American soil.
62	10	"Chapter 62"	Agnieszka Holland	Kenneth Lin	May 30, 2017	HOC-510
As Frank discovers Jackie Sharp will be testifying before the Declaration of War Committee, Claire is informed that the American from the Antarctic expedition froze to death. Claire wants the body to get lost in transit. With Romero heading the committee, Frank tries to get in his good graces again by offering him the position of party whip. Romero, however, is not looking to negotiate. Jackie pleads the Fifth during her testimony. LeAnn becomes concerned about Aidan, who is not willing to reveal what he told the Russians. Jane makes it clear that what is important is learning what Aidan divulged. She also informs the Underwoods that a gas attack is imminent in Syria, advising that they send in 30,000 troops after the attack and divert the committee's attention. When Frank and Claire tell Durant, she begins questioning the operation and later voices her protest to Jane. Doug confronts a frightened Lisa, who then tells Tom about the encounter. During pillow talk, Claire confesses to Yates that Frank killed Zoe and Peter Russo. LeAnn is confronted in a parking garage by Aidan, who is alive. The two share a close moment before he leaves. Usher informs Frank that President Walker will be testifying. Though Walker is expected to plead the Fifth, tension arises when he and Frank meet before the hearing. Walker breaks his silence, revealing that it was Frank who got him financially involved with the Chinese. That night, LeAnn is given a voice recording revealing that Aidan has been murdered in his hotel room. Meanwhile, Jane shreds files regarding the dead Antarctic worker and Aidan.
63	11	"Chapter 63"	Agnieszka Holland	Laura Eason	May 30, 2017	HOC-511
On The Rachel Maddow Show, Seth and Tom debate Walker's credibility in the wake of his testimony. Frank, Claire, Doug, and Usher discuss impeachment and the idea of censure, which Frank and Doug oppose. The next day, Tom discovers leaked information that the White House staged the terrorist threat on Election Day. Seth panics while Frank discusses spying on all White House personnel to identify the leaker. While alone, Claire truly breaks the fourth wall for the first time in the series and monologues directly to the camera audience. The FBI tells LeAnn that Aidan's death looked like a suicide, but the gun is missing. Meanwhile, Claire tells Yates she wants him to leave. Frank is confronted by Democratic congressmen Bob Birch and Terry Womack, who want Frank to consider resignation. Doug spies on West Wing staffers and is intrigued when LeAnn receives something unknown from Aidan. After confessing to Laura that he is the reason her husband died, Doug goes to LeAnn's apartment and the two have sex. Tom's article drops the next day reporting that a source within the White House confirmed that Frank used questionable intelligence to close polling stations during the election. Frank confronts Durant about this; she is cooperating with Romero. Frank later states that he believes Durant is the leak and that he has held on to her resignation. News breaks that Durant will testify before the committee. An unknown source gives Tom a "birthday card" containing a USB flash drive.
64	12	"Chapter 64"	Robin Wright	Frank Pugliese & Melissa James Gibson	May 30, 2017	HOC-512
Frank tries to dissuade Durant from testifying before the committee, but she adamantly refuses. As she leaves, Frank pushes her down a flight of stairs, knocking her unconscious, and claims she's fallen. Durant is hospitalized and thus prevented from testifying. Frank holds a press conference regarding the Syrian gas attack. However, reporters ask him about the growing possibility of impeachment. Frank is informed that Tom is investigating Zoe's death and believes that it was not an accident. Needing to focus attention away from them, the Underwoods agree that someone must take the fall. The next night, Frank and Claire hold a dinner for Doug, where they try to convince him to take the blame for Zoe's murder. Though initially off-put, Doug goes to LeAnn and "confesses", though she does not believe him. It is revealed that Doug is in possession of birthday cards similar to those sent to Tom. Claire discovers that Yates has been continuing his manuscript, which includes her confessions about the murders of Zoe and Russo. She goes to visit Yates to convince him not to publish, but he refuses and threatens to blackmail her. Claire and Yates have sex, but he suddenly dies from poison Claire had put in his whiskey. Usher discovers his body the next morning, whereupon he is forced to quietly "dispose" of it. LeAnn and Nathan Green give their testimony. Frank, watching, debates whether he should testify as well. While he is urged not to, Frank goes to the committee and, while he claims to have done nothing wrong, he accuses the committee of trying to sabotage his presidency and that he respects the office too much to allow the investigation to go on. As a result, Frank announces he will resign the following day.
65	13	"Chapter 65"	Robin Wright	Melissa James Gibson & Frank Pugliese	May 30, 2017	HOC-513
Claire protests Frank's resignation, but he concludes it is the best outcome for everyone. He reveals that he has been planning this since the weekend retreat before the Ohio and Tennessee elections, where he concluded that the real power is not in who occupies the White House, but who "owns" it. Frank reveals he is behind the leaks to Tom. Claire then confesses to him that she has killed Yates and that there is no way it will lead back to them. After Frank resigns, Claire is sworn in and assumes the presidency, whereupon she leads an operation to track down Al Ahmadi. Doug is interviewed by Tom, who is continuing his investigation into Zoe's death. LeAnn is appointed as Claire's Chief of Staff with the agreement that she turns over everything she knew about Aidan to Jane. However, shortly after she does so, Claire, Davis and Usher claim that the impending war means a more experienced Chief of Staff is needed, and LeAnn is presumably fired or forced to resign. That night, on her way to meet with Doug, LeAnn's car is run off the road and she is killed. Seth is also replaced at Claire's behest. Frank asks for a public pardon from Claire for both him and Doug. She agrees to do so in her upcoming televised address, but tells Frank that for their secret arrangement to work, he has to leave the White House and make it appear that they are estranged. Frank reluctantly does so. That night, Claire gives her first televised address as the new President, informing the nation that they have killed Al Ahmadi and that the U.S. is sending troops into Syria to combat the Syrian regime. However, she gives no mention of a pardon to Frank or Doug, despite having agreed to do so. Meanwhile, Eric Rawlings, Frank's ex-personal trainer, is killed by guards after climbing over the gates at a pacifist demonstration in front of the White House. Frank, who has been watching the broadcast from his hotel room, angrily calls Claire, but she rejects the call, breaks the fourth wall, and coldly declares: "My turn."

== Reception ==
=== Critical response ===
On Rotten Tomatoes, the season has an approval rating of 72% based on 46 reviews, with an average rating of 7.1/10. The consensus reads, "House of Cards enjoys a confident return to form this season, though its outlandish edge is tempered slightly by the current political climate." On Metacritic, the season has a weighted average score of 60 out of 100, based on 11 critics, indicating "mixed or average" reviews.

=== Accolades ===
House of Cards received four major nominations for the 69th Primetime Emmy Awards, including Outstanding Drama Series, Kevin Spacey for Outstanding Lead Actor in a Drama Series, Robin Wright for Outstanding Lead Actress in a Drama Series, and Michael Kelly for Outstanding Supporting Actor in a Drama Series.

== Controversy ==
Following the fifth season's release during early production of the sixth season in October 2017, sexual misconduct allegations against Kevin Spacey surfaced. Netflix briefly halted production and made the decision in November 2017 to part ways with the actor, marking the fifth season as his final appearance in the series.
