= House of Cards season 4 =

Season of the American television drama series House of Cards

House of Cards
- Season 4
- Blu-ray cover
- Showrunner: Beau Willimon
- Starring: Kevin Spacey; Robin Wright; Michael Kelly; Sebastian Arcelus; Mahershala Ali; Boris McGiver; Molly Parker; Jayne Atkinson; Elizabeth Marvel; Derek Cecil; Paul Sparks; Neve Campbell; Joel Kinnaman
- No. of episodes: 13

Release
- Original network: Netflix
- Original release: March 4, 2016

Season chronology
- ← Previous; Season 3 Next → Season 5

The fourth season of the American television drama series House of Cards was announced by Netflix via Twitter on April 2, 2015. Filming began on June 16, 2015. The season premiered on March 4, 2016.

== Production ==
On April 2, 2015, Netflix announced via its Twitter account that it had renewed House of Cards for a fourth season of undisclosed length, to be released in early 2016. The tweet read: "I will leave a legacy. #Underwood2016". The first casting calls were announced on May 5, 2015, to occur on May 15. Film crews were spotted filming on June 16, 2015.

In December 2015, it was revealed during a 2016 Republican Party presidential debate through faux advertising that the season would premiere on March 4, 2016. In January, show creator, executive producer and showrunner Beau Willimon's departure following the season was announced. The first trailer for the season, which focused on the contentious relationship between the Underwoods, was released on February 10. The press release associated with the trailer said "In an election year, the stakes are now higher than ever, and the biggest threat they face is contending with each other."

== Cast ==
On July 1, 2015, Neve Campbell was announced as having been cast for season 4. In September 2015, Colm Feore was announced as having a recurring role. In February 2016, Joel Kinnaman was announced as having a recurring role. On February 10, Ellen Burstyn and Cicely Tyson were announced as cast members in conjunction with the release of the first trailer for the season.

- Kevin Spacey as Francis J. Underwood, the President of the United States
- Robin Wright as Claire Underwood, First Lady of the United States and former United States Ambassador to the United Nations
- Michael Kelly as Douglas "Doug" Stamper, the White House Chief of Staff
- Mahershala Ali as Remy Danton, the former White House Chief of Staff under President Underwood
- Jayne Atkinson as Catherine Durant, Secretary of State
- Neve Campbell as LeAnn Harvey, a Texas-based political consultant
- Derek Cecil as Seth Grayson, the White House Press Secretary
- Nathan Darrow as Edward Meechum, the Underwoods' Secret Service bodyguard
- Kim Dickens as Kate Baldwin
- Elizabeth Marvel as Heather Dunbar, the former Solicitor General of the United States and Democratic presidential candidate
- Dominique McElligott as Hannah Conway, wife of New York Governor and Republican presidential nominee Will Conway
- Molly Parker as Jacqueline "Jackie" Sharp, the Deputy House Minority Whip and Democratic presidential candidate
- Damian Young as Aidan Macallan, data scientist and friend of LeAnn Harvey
- Paul Sparks as Thomas Yates, an author and speechwriter for the Underwoods
- Sebastian Arcelus as Lucas Goodwin, former reporter at The Washington Herald
- Boris McGiver as Tom Hammerschmidt, the former editor of The Washington Herald and former boss of Lucas Goodwin
- Ellen Burstyn as Elizabeth Hale, Claire's mother
- Colm Feore as General Ted Brockhart, Republican vice presidential candidate
- Cicely Tyson as Doris Jones, a Texas congresswoman
- LisaGay Hamilton as Celia Jones, Doris' daughter
- Joel Kinnaman as Will Conway, the Republican nominee for president and Governor of New York
- Lars Mikkelsen as Viktor Petrov, the President of the Russian Federation
- Larry Pine as Bob Birch, the House Minority Leader and a Democratic U.S. Representative from Michigan
- Reed Birney as Donald Blythe, the Vice President of the United States
- Eisa Davis as Cynthia Driscoll, Heather Dunbar's campaign manager
- Curtiss Cook as Terry Womack, the House Minority Whip
- Constance Zimmer as Janine Skorsky
- Michel Gill as Garrett Walker, the former President of the United States and Frank's predecessor
- Kate Mara as reporter Zoe Barnes
- Corey Stoll as former Congressman Peter Russo
- Kathleen Chalfant as Margaret Tilden, CEO of The Washington Herald
- Gerald McRaney as Raymond Tusk, former associate of President Walker's and adversary of Frank
- Reg E. Cathey as Frederick "Freddy" Hayes, White House gardener and former restaurant owner
- Wendy Moniz as Laura Moretti, widow of a liver transplant candidate

== Episodes ==
No. overall	No. in season	Title	Directed by	Written by	Original release date	Prod. code
40	1	"Chapter 40"	Tucker Gates	Beau Willimon	March 4, 2016	HOC-401
President Frank Underwood works on the next phase of his 2016 election campaign. Rumors about Claire's absence on the campaign trail grow. She is staying at the home of her mother, Elizabeth Hale, though they do not speak to each other for the first few days. Claire hires LeAnn Harvey to help her begin a campaign for a local congressional seat, currently held by Doris Jones. LeAnn says that it is assumed Doris' daughter Celia will run for the seat next; Claire insists that they will need to change their minds about that. When Claire and her mother finally talk, Elizabeth voices her contempt for Frank. Doug arrives at the meeting with Doris and Celia and sabotages the discussion. However, Claire tells LeAnn that she is not giving up. Frank visits Claire and reveals that Elizabeth is suffering from terminal lymphoma. The two make a deal: Claire will attend the State of the Union address in exchange for Frank leaving her campaign alone. The Underwoods make a press announcement together, explaining Claire's absence from the campaign. Meanwhile, disgraced journalist Lucas Goodwin is released from prison under witness protection and is settled into an apartment under an alias.
41	2	"Chapter 41"	Tucker Gates	Melissa James Gibson	March 4, 2016	HOC-402
Claire starts her own power play for Doris' congressional seat, putting her and Frank at odds with each other. Elizabeth urges her friends to indirectly contribute to Dunbar's campaign. Frank makes last minute changes to his speech before delivering the State of the Union address, announcing that he will be funding Doris' health care center and support Celia's bid to take over her mother's seat, thus effectively ending Claire's chances. In the Situation Room, Frank is told that Russian President Viktor Petrov has had several political rivals killed and that Igor Milkin, a Russian oligarch, has come to the U.S. requesting asylum. Frank and Secretary of State Catherine Durant call Petrov to discuss the situation, and Petrov accuses Frank of sponsoring an attempted coup against him. Claire and Elizabeth argue about money for her campaign, and Claire threatens to sell the family property that is in her name.
42	3	"Chapter 42"	Robin Wright	Frank Pugliese	March 4, 2016	HOC-403
Doris and Celia introduce Frank at predominantly African-American church in his hometown of Gaffney, South Carolina. Claire arrives to help Frank with the South Carolina primary, but he does not trust her. Meanwhile, LeAnn accesses the Underwoods' safe deposit box and uses its contents to engineer a scandal by leaking a picture of Frank's father with a KKK member, which is hung across a prominent billboard. Frank addresses the black church again, giving the congregation context for the photo. However, Seth sends LeAnn a photo of Frank with a Confederate reenactor which then goes public as well, and Frank loses the South Carolina primary. Frank finds Claire's earrings in the safe deposit box, revealing the scandals to be a part of her plan to wake Frank up to the shortcomings of his campaign and how much he needs her on his side. She demands that he make her his running mate, but Frank dismisses her proposal.
43	4	"Chapter 43"	Robin Wright	John Mankiewicz	March 4, 2016	HOC-404
In the Situation Room, Frank and the Joint Chiefs of Staff plan a dangerous political ploy using Milkin as leverage against Petrov. Durant objects on the grounds that the move could trigger a hostile response from Russia, but Frank overrides her and instructs them to draw up the plan. He is later shown signing the plan against Durant's repeated objection. Meanwhile, protesters picket a campaign rally at Hammond University. Frank delivers a speech to the friendly crowd inside the university, then goes outside to greet the protesters. While doing so, he is shot twice by Lucas Goodwin. Edward Meechum returns fire at Goodwin, and both he and Goodwin die from their injuries. Underwood is brought to the hospital in critical condition and Vice President Donald Blythe is sworn in as Acting President. Blythe meets with Frank's cabinet and is presented with the decision to either continue or abort the Milkin operation. He is indecisive and asks for time to think the situation over. Doug brings in Claire to help, and with her assistance, Blythe instead decides to land Milkin's plane in China.
44	5	"Chapter 44"	Tom Shankland	Kenneth Lin	March 4, 2016	HOC-405
The FBI tells Doug that Goodwin left behind a suicide note detailing out his belief that Frank killed Zoe Barnes and Peter Russo (in Season 1), and that the note was already entered as evidence and cannot be hidden away. Doug tells Claire about the note and she asks for a copy. Meanwhile, Blythe is preparing to speak with Petrov about the Milkin situation and asks Claire for help. She offers to sit in on the call, but he tells her Durant would object. Claire then offers to secretly listen in on the call and text him advice on how to respond to Petrov. During the call, Blythe tells Petrov that Frank may not survive, and so the two of them need to learn how to negotiate with each other. Claire addresses the press about Frank's health and also explains away Goodwin's accusations as "mental illness". Following up on the story, Kate tracks down Tom Hammerschmidt, who reiterates that he does not believe Goodwin's allegations either. Meanwhile, Frank suffers hallucinations as his health continues to deteriorate. The doctors tell Doug that Frank needs a liver transplant to survive.
45	6	"Chapter 45"	Tom Shankland	Laura Eason	March 4, 2016	HOC-406
Blythe, Tusk, and the cabinet discuss Claire's Russian economic assistance plan, which calls for the U.S. to share oil drilling technologies in exchange for China carrying a larger part of the bailout's cost. Blythe intends to present the plan at the upcoming G7 Summit in Germany. Blythe adds Claire to the G7 delegation, against Durant's wishes. Petrov refuses to negotiate with Durant but will talk with Claire. After arguing the terms, she tells Petrov that he is a beggar and will take what he is given. Meanwhile, Dunbar is questioned by the Department of Justice about her meeting with Goodwin. She admits to it and uses the opportunity to go after the Underwood Administration, but this effectively ends her candidacy. LeAnn is told that the Republican frontrunner, Governor Will Conway of New York, is manipulating search engine hits to increase his visibility for the election, which may be an insurmountable advantage. Informed of this, Claire is too preoccupied to address the issue. Doug intimidates the Secretary of Health and Human Services to make sure that Frank is next on the list for liver transplants. A teenager's suicide provides a viable liver and Frank goes into surgery. He is moved to the White House as soon as he can talk. While recovering from surgery, he asks Claire, "Stay with me." She insists things would have to be different than before, and he agrees. He later signs the bailout agreement Claire created.
46	7	"Chapter 46"	Tom Shankland	Bill Kennedy	March 4, 2016	HOC-407
Dunbar drops out of the campaign, leaving Frank the last remaining Democratic candidate. He manipulates Blythe into stepping aside as Vice President and asks the Cabinet to look for a new running mate. Claire talks to the press about gun control, specifically where guns can be purchased without background checks. She speaks with Julia, a NRA representative, whom she ruthlessly attacks on Frank's advice. Meanwhile, Tom investigates Goodwin's death and visits Janine Skorsky, who confirms his accusations. Conway, who is leading Frank in the polls, is illegally using the search engine Pollyhop to gain an unfair advantage in the election. Doug works to expose Conway's activity while LeAnn advises using the threat of ICO, a terrorist organization, to get the FISA Court to authorize domestic surveillance. Conway holds a live webcast admitting to the Pollyhop data mining and wins a huge jump in the polls while doing so. Claire advises Frank to abort a military strike against ICO and instead go forward with LeAnn's plan; he agrees. Later, the Underwoods watch footage showing they had met the Conways at President Walker's 2013 New Year's Eve party. They vow to destroy the Conways together.
47	8	"Chapter 47"	Alex Graves	John Mankiewicz	March 4, 2016	HOC-408
The Conways talk to Yates about publishing his book on the Underwoods, offering publicity through their connections at Vanity Fair. Later, Claire meets with Yates and offers to bring him back on staff to let him finish the book the way he wants to in exchange for speechwriting advice; he agrees with the offer. Frank meets with Senator Dean Austen of Ohio, the Democratic leadership's top pick for his running mate. Meanwhile, Aidan secretly passes information to LeAnn, who in turn anonymously delivers a quarter million names and phone numbers to the gun control lobby. Claire records an emotional plea for gun control, asking people to call their senators. Later, she tells Julia that they coordinated eighty-four thousand calls to senators in less than 24 hours. Frank intimidates Austen into publicly supporting Claire's gun control bill, which destroys his relationship with the NRA and his chances at being Vice President. Conway offers Ted Brockhart, a U.S. Army General critical of Frank's policy toward ICO, to be his running mate. Brockhart agrees, and they arrange a photoshoot for Vanity Fair and an exclusive interview with Kate. Hammerschmidt continues exploring Zoe's life, following Goodwin's trail, and discovers that Meechum used to frequent a pizza place near Zoe's old apartment.
48	9	"Chapter 48"	Robin Wright	Frank Pugliese	March 4, 2016	HOC-409
At the Democratic National Convention in Atlanta, the party holds an open selection of Frank's running mate. Durant takes an early lead, but LeAnn works with Celia Jones to leverage Texas' votes for Claire. The Underwoods then offer both Durant and Baker the position of Secretary of State if they throw their support behind Claire. Conway goes on the air demanding that Frank give an apology to Brockhart, and that he do something about ICO. Frank's response is to "kill them with kindness": he publicly apologizes to Brockhart, and asks to meet Conway privately to discuss action on ICO. The two meet in private and talk to each other, but not about ICO. When convention voting resumes, Louisiana votes for Durant as President and pushes to reconsider Frank as the official nominee. Conway reveals that he was contacted by Durant to coordinate the vote. Claire leaves for Texas, taking Yates with her to work on her potential acceptance speech.
49	10	"Chapter 49"	Robin Wright	Melissa James Gibson and Kenneth Lin	March 4, 2016	HOC-410
An early morning Slugline article praises Claire's role in the G7 summit negotiations, while attacking Durant as being ineffective. Frank announces he is returning to Washington to deal with an ICO advance. On Air Force One, Durant tells Frank that she will sow dissent at the convention until he has Claire support her as the vice presidential nominee. Claire visits her mother Elizabeth, who has moved downstairs on the advice of hospice care. Though mother and daughter still have a strained relationship, Elizabeth and Yates have an instant rapport. The hospice nurse tells Claire they can give Elizabeth medication to make her comfortable and ease her death. Claire helps Elizabeth take an overdose and she peacefully dies shortly after. Later, she and Yates sleep together. Meanwhile, LeAnn confronts Doug about going after her, and tells him he will not find anything on her. Doug confronts Seth, who defies him at first, but let the two talk and Seth insists it is time they all work together. Frank and Durant continue their argument in the Situation Room. Claire begins to doubt their plan and tells Frank to consider letting Durant win the nomination as his running mate, but he insists they press on. Frank then uses the rumors of Zoe and Russo to intimidate Durant into giving up her votes to Claire. Frank and Claire are announced as the Democratic ticket for the general election.
50	11	"Chapter 50"	Kari Skogland	Tian Jun Gu	March 4, 2016	HOC-411
After experiencing pain on Air Force One, Frank is told he can only fly once per week during his recovery. They decide that Claire will continue on the campaign trail without him. She and Yates work on her speeches and they resume their affair. Yates leaves the campaign and Frank confronts him. Frank later tells Claire she should take Yates back on the campaign with her. Meanwhile, Frank wants to go after ICO even harder and instructs Durant and Doug to coordinate the involvement of Russian troops, but their efforts are blocked by Conway. Frank then decides to move forward with a ground operation using U.S. troops. Doug receives a voicemail from widow Laura Moretti, to whom Doug donated money; Laura's husband Tony had died after failing to receive the liver that went to Frank instead. Doug returns the call and later meets with her at a restaurant. Remy meets Tom at the former site of Freddy's restaurant. Remy confirms little at first, but later they play a game of "Never Have I Ever" and he indirectly confirms Frank's crimes. Tom returns to The Washington Herald to continue his work.
51	12	"Chapter 51"	Jakob Verbruggen	Laura Eason and Bill Kennedy	March 4, 2016	HOC-412
Frank, Claire, Conway, and Brockhart hold a debate while Aidan runs his algorithms on their talking points. Conway and Brockhart deny Frank's accusation that they worked to block the use of Russian troops against ICO. Doug pressures a reluctant congressman to publicly state that they did. Meanwhile, ICO has taken three hostages, the Miller family from Knoxville, Tennessee, demanding a withdrawal of U.S. troops and the release of ICO's captured leader, and insisting they will speak only to Conway. Doug brings agents of the FBI and Homeland Security to Aidan's office, and they are able to identify the hostage takers. Frank calls Conway in order to help with the hostage situation, but it remains unresolved. Tom tells former President Walker that Frank conspired to have him impeached and asks him to help expose Frank's crimes. Remy and Jackie meet and discuss Tom's investigation, and Jackie says she wants to go on record about Frank. Claire asks Doug to work on an unrevealed plan for the next morning. In the meantime, he goes home to rest and Laura cooks him dinner.
52	13	"Chapter 52"	Jakob Verbruggen	Beau Willimon	March 4, 2016	HOC-413
Frank demands the hostage takers release female members of the Miller family. Meanwhile, Claire negotiates with Yusuf al Ahmadi, who was being held in Guantánamo Bay. The girl and her mother are rescued by the FBI after the hostage takers disclose their location, though James Miller remains a hostage. Ahmadi says he'll help negotiate James' release, but breaks the agreement when he goes on the line with the hostage takers. Tom asks for an interview with Frank regarding his article. Frank calls the story "unsubstantiated tabloid gossip" being used as political ammunition. Tom publishes the article without an official comment from Frank, and Jackie and Remy go into hiding soon after its release. Meanwhile, the FBI and Homeland Security take control of the surveillance algorithm. Without Aidan and Doug in control, their use of the algorithm in the election is at risk of being exposed. The Underwoods discuss how to handle their vulnerable position, and Claire suggests leveraging people's fear. Frank makes a speech to the public, telling the nation to prepare for total war against ICO. The end of the episode shows the Underwoods and the cabinet sitting in the Situation Room watching the terrorists' live video of James Miller's execution, and both Frank and Claire break the fourth wall.

== Reception ==
=== Critical response ===
The fourth season has received positive reviews from critics. On Metacritic, the season has a score of 76 out of 100 based on 17 reviews. On Rotten Tomatoes, the season has an 86% approval rating, with an average rating of 7.7/10 based on 36 reviews. The site's critical consensus reads, "House of Cards retains its binge-worthiness by ratcheting up the drama, and deepening Robin Wright's role even further." Matt Fowler of IGN gave the season a rating of 8.6 out of 10 and labelled the season "great" with particular praise given to the performances, the addition of new characters, connections to previous seasons and adding new adversaries to the Underwoods.

=== Accolades ===
House of Cards received 13 nominations in the drama categories for the 68th Primetime Emmy Awards, including Outstanding Drama Series, Kevin Spacey for Outstanding Lead Actor, Robin Wright for Outstanding Lead Actress, Michael Kelly for Outstanding Supporting Actor, Reg E. Cathey, Paul Sparks and Mahershala Ali for Outstanding Guest Actor, and Ellen Burstyn and Molly Parker for Outstanding Guest Actress.
