= Ian Flanders =

American actor, director, writer and producer

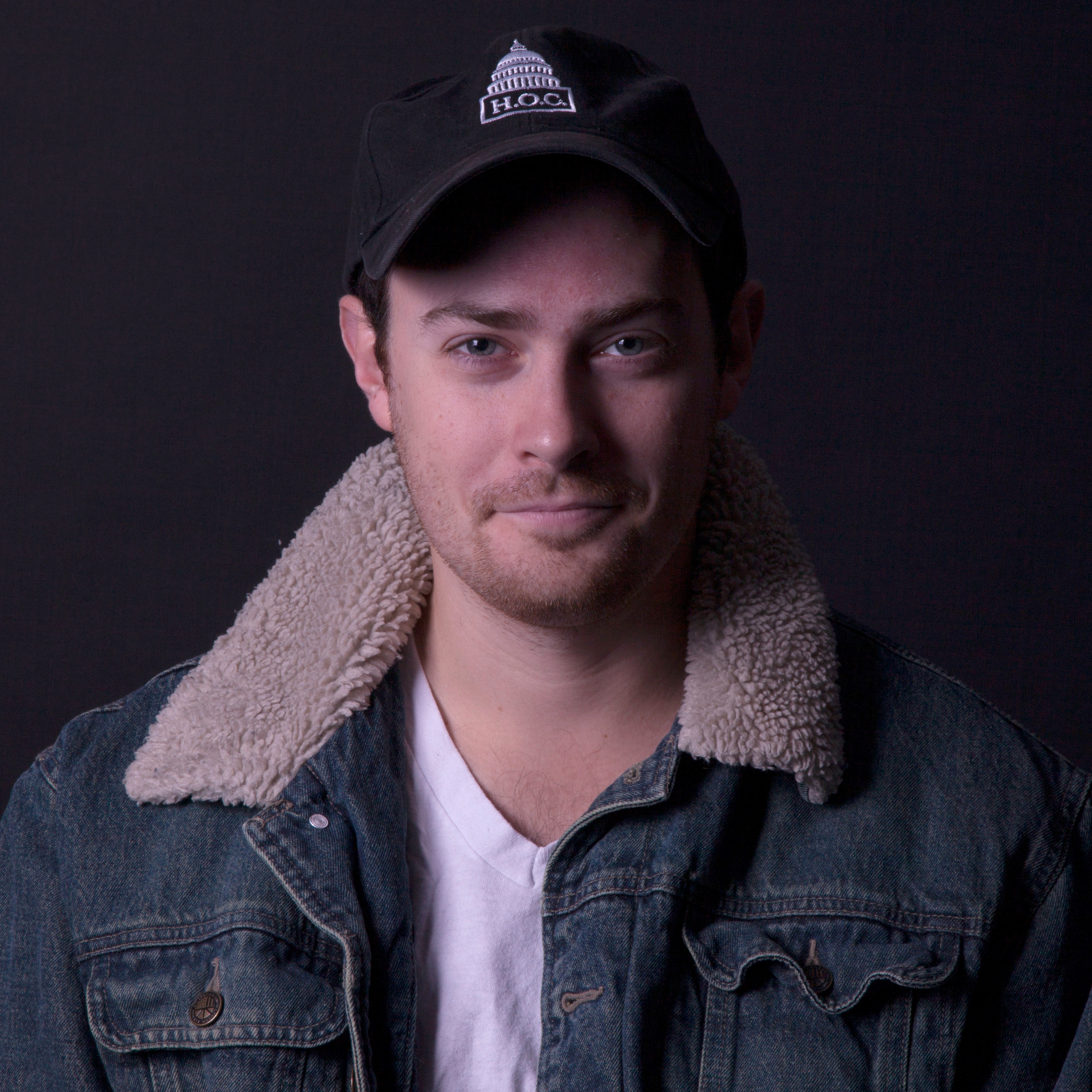
- Born: Ian Mark Flanders; March 25, 1990 (age 35); Shutesbury, Massachusetts, U.S.
- Occupations: Actor, Director, Writer, Producer
- Known for: Netflix's House of Cards
- Website: ianflanders.com

Ian Mark Flanders (born March 25, 1990) is an American actor, director, writer and producer. He was born in Shutesbury, Massachusetts, and is known for his work on Tom Hayden: In Hiding (2016), The Deal (2010) and House of Cards (2013). Flanders was Kevin Spacey's stand-in on Netflix's, "House of Cards" for the first five seasons of filming.

== Early life ==
Ian Mark Flanders was born in Shutesbury, Massachusetts, to Rita Singer, an art therapist, and Will Flanders who ran a law firm. After his parents divorced, his mother moved the two of them to Reisterstown, Maryland.

Flanders attended Franklin High School, where he was a member of the soccer and lacrosse teams.

== Career ==
=== Netflix's House of Cards ===
Ian Flanders stood in for Kevin Spacey on Netflix's House of Cards for all five of the actor's seasons on the series.

=== Filmography ===
- Tom Hayden: In Hiding - "Tom Hayden" (APLBX - 2019)
- House Of Cards - Season 6; Episode 7 - "Nurse" (Netflix/MRC - 2018)
- Cut Shoot Kill - "Shooter" (Amazon Prime)
- Man of God (Short)
- The Deal (Short)
- Frostbite (Short)

=== Theatre ===
- Richard III - Henry, Earl of Richmond
- A Mid Summer Nights Dream - Lysander
- You Can't Take It With You - Anthony Kirby Jr.
- Bye Bye Birdie - Hugo F. Peabody
