= House of Cards season 6 =

Season of the American television drama series House of Cards

House of Cards
- Season 6
- Blu-ray cover
- Showrunners: Melissa James Gibson; Frank Pugliese
- Starring: Robin Wright; Michael Kelly; Constance Zimmer; Boris McGiver; Derek Cecil; Lars Mikkelsen; Campbell Scott; Patricia Clarkson; Diane Lane; Greg Kinnear; Cody Fern
- No. of episodes: 8

Release
- Original network: Netflix
- Original release: November 2, 2018

Season chronology
- ← Previous; Season 5

The sixth and final season of House of Cards, an American political drama television series created by Beau Willimon for Netflix, was released on November 2, 2018. Frank Pugliese and Melissa James Gibson returned as showrunners for the final season. The sixth season continues the story of recently-inaugurated, Democratic president Claire Underwood (Robin Wright), who faces new threats within and outside the White House following the death of her husband and former president Frank Underwood. Powerful elites, led by wealthy siblings Annette and Bill Shepherd (Diane Lane and Greg Kinnear), are attempting to manipulate and destroy her presidency, while Claire struggles to exert influence and escape her husband's shadow.

The sixth season marks the only of the series without Kevin Spacey, who portrayed lead character Frank Underwood. Soon after production began in October 2017, Netflix fired the actor as a result of sexual misconduct allegations made against him. Production was halted for several months while the scripts were reworked to exclude Spacey's character. As a result, the season was reduced to eight episodes, deviating from the 13-episode format of the previous seasons.

== Production ==
=== Unannounced start and sudden shutdown ===
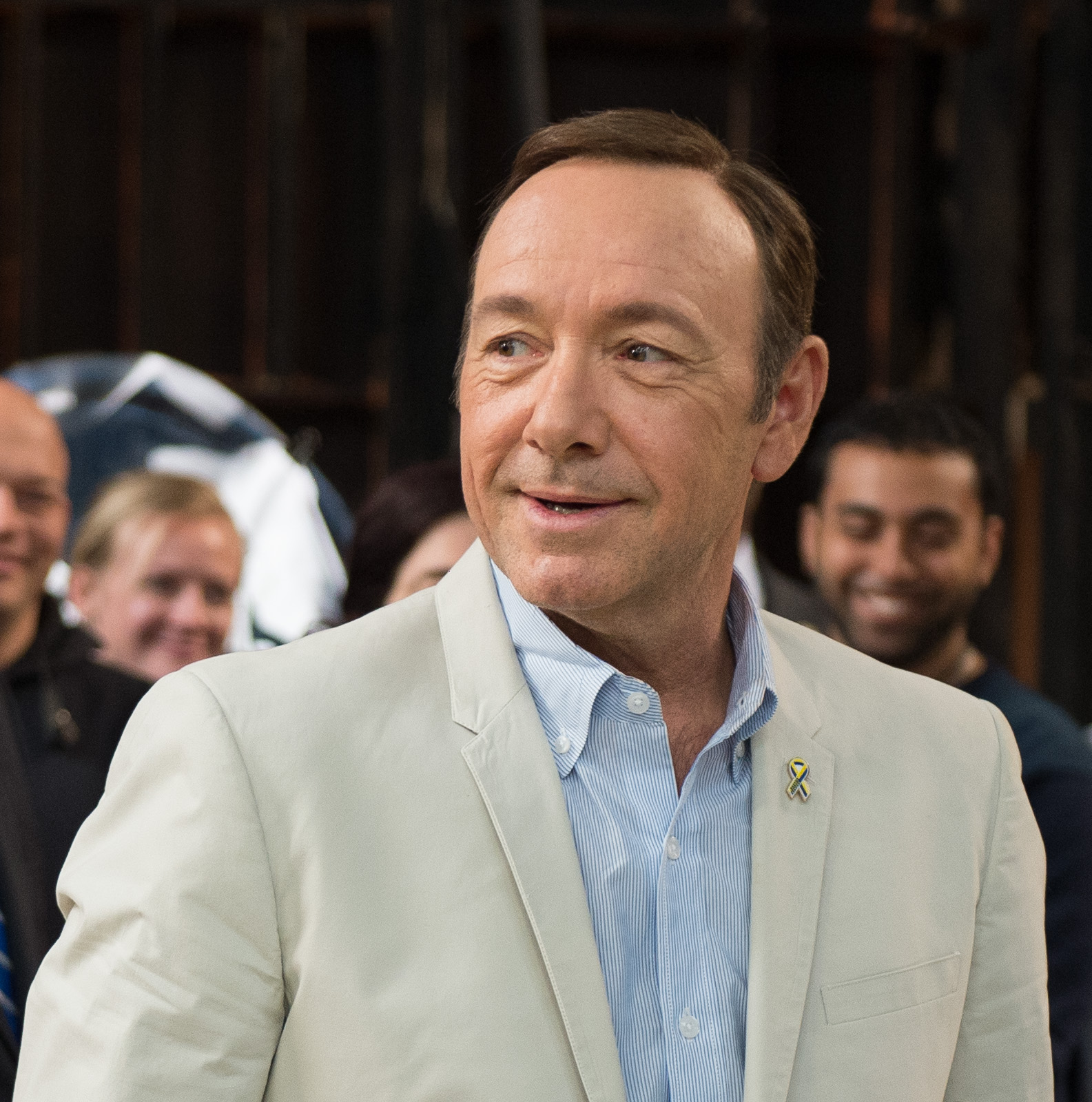
Kevin Spacey was removed after sexual misconduct allegations were made against him.

On October 11, 2017, The Baltimore Sun reported that House of Cards had been renewed for a sixth season and that filming would begin by the end of October 2017. On October 18, 2017, production of the sixth season of House of Cards appeared to be already in progress, without an official renewal announcement by Netflix, when a gunman opened fire near a House of Cards set outside Baltimore. Production company Media Rights Capital and Netflix stated that production on the show was not affected by the shooting.

Production on the series was shut down on October 30, 2017, following sexual assault allegations towards Kevin Spacey by actor Anthony Rapp, who publicly stated that Spacey had made a sexual advance on him in 1986, when Rapp was 14 years old. Netflix announced its decision to cancel the series after the upcoming season, although multiple sources stated that the decision to end the series had been made prior to Rapp's accusation.

The following day, Netflix and MRC announced that production on the season would be suspended indefinitely, in order to review the current situation and to address any concerns of the cast and crew. Robin Wright strongly opposed Netflix executives who wanted to cancel the season, as she was concerned about the 2,500 people who had been involved in the production at that time and were at risk of losing their jobs. On November 3, 2017, Netflix announced that they would no longer be associated with Spacey in any capacity whatsoever.

=== Restarting production ===
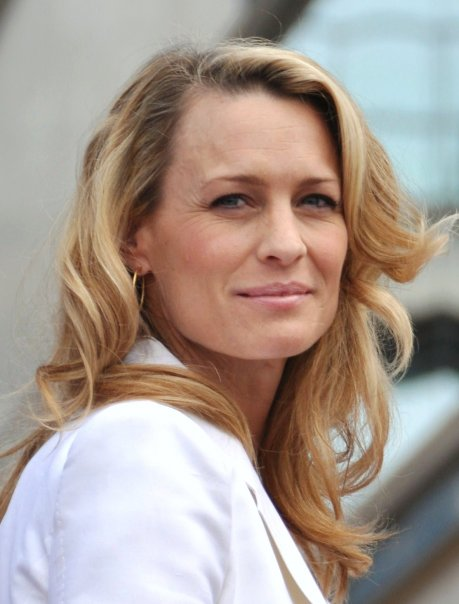
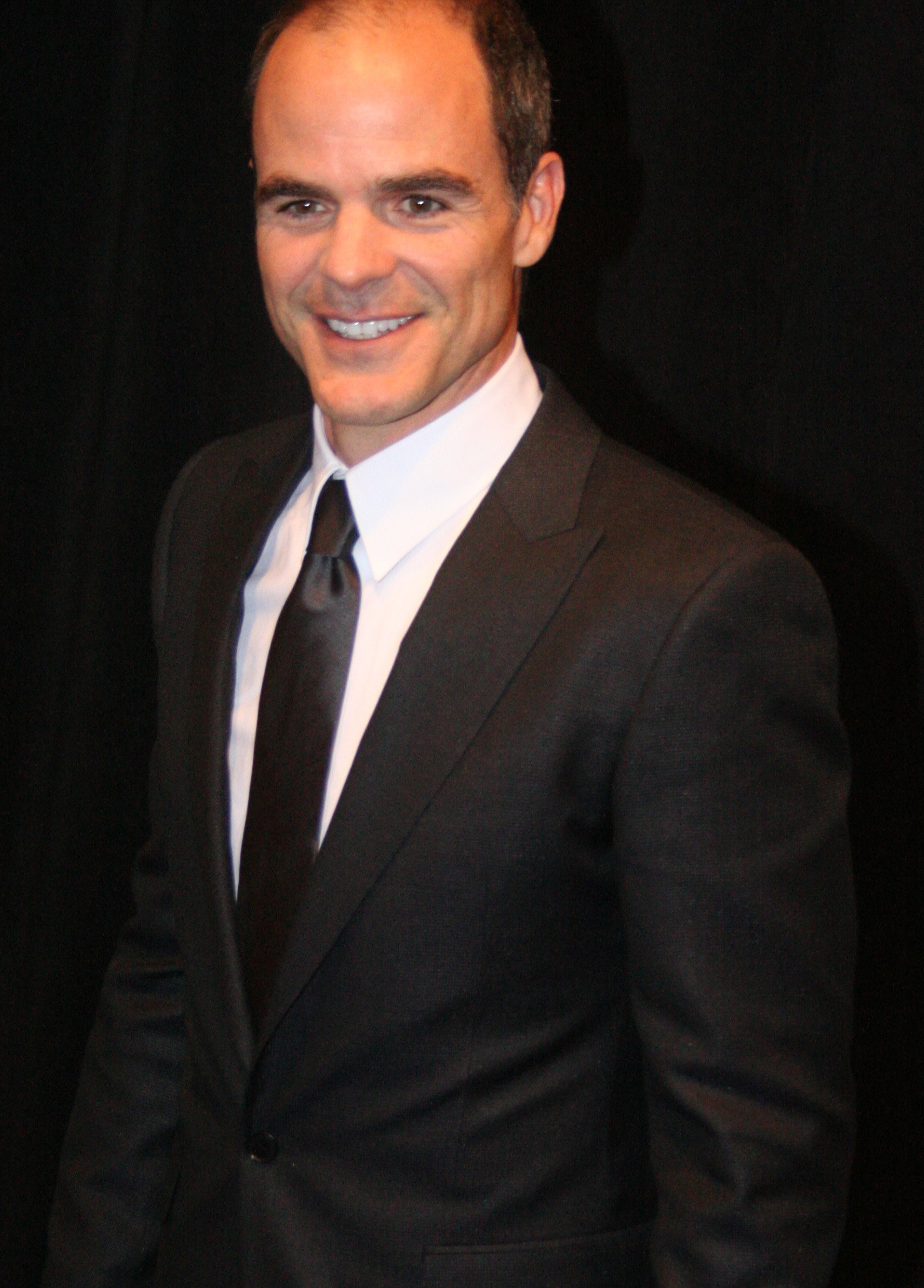
In Spacey's absence, the season is led by series mainstays Robin Wright (left) and Michael Kelly (right).

On December 4, 2017, Ted Sarandos, Netflix's chief content officer, announced that production would restart in 2018 with Wright in the lead, without Spacey's involvement, and revealed that the sixth and final season of the show would consist of eight episodes. House of Cards resumed production on January 31, and wrapped filming four months later, on May 25, 2018.

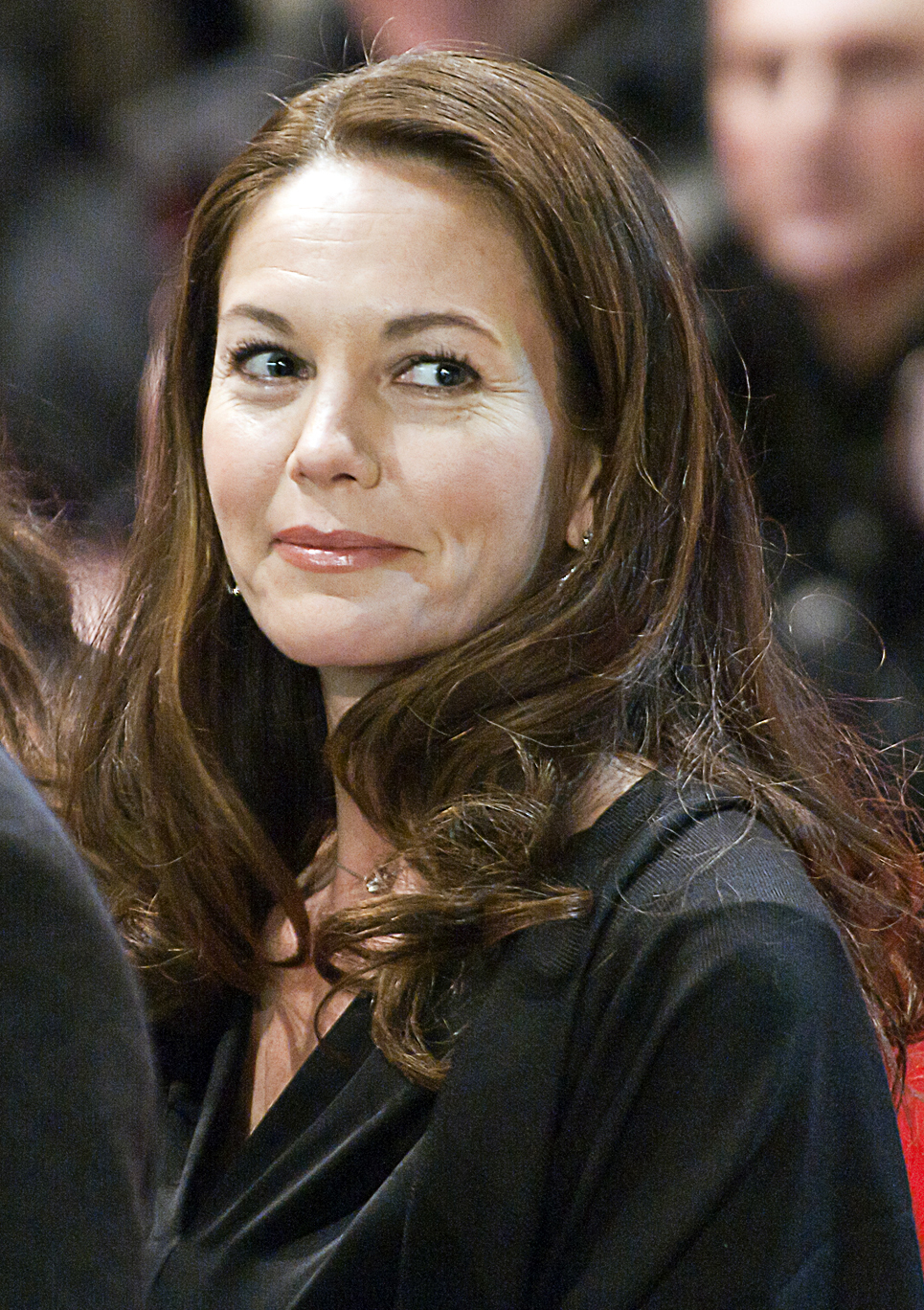
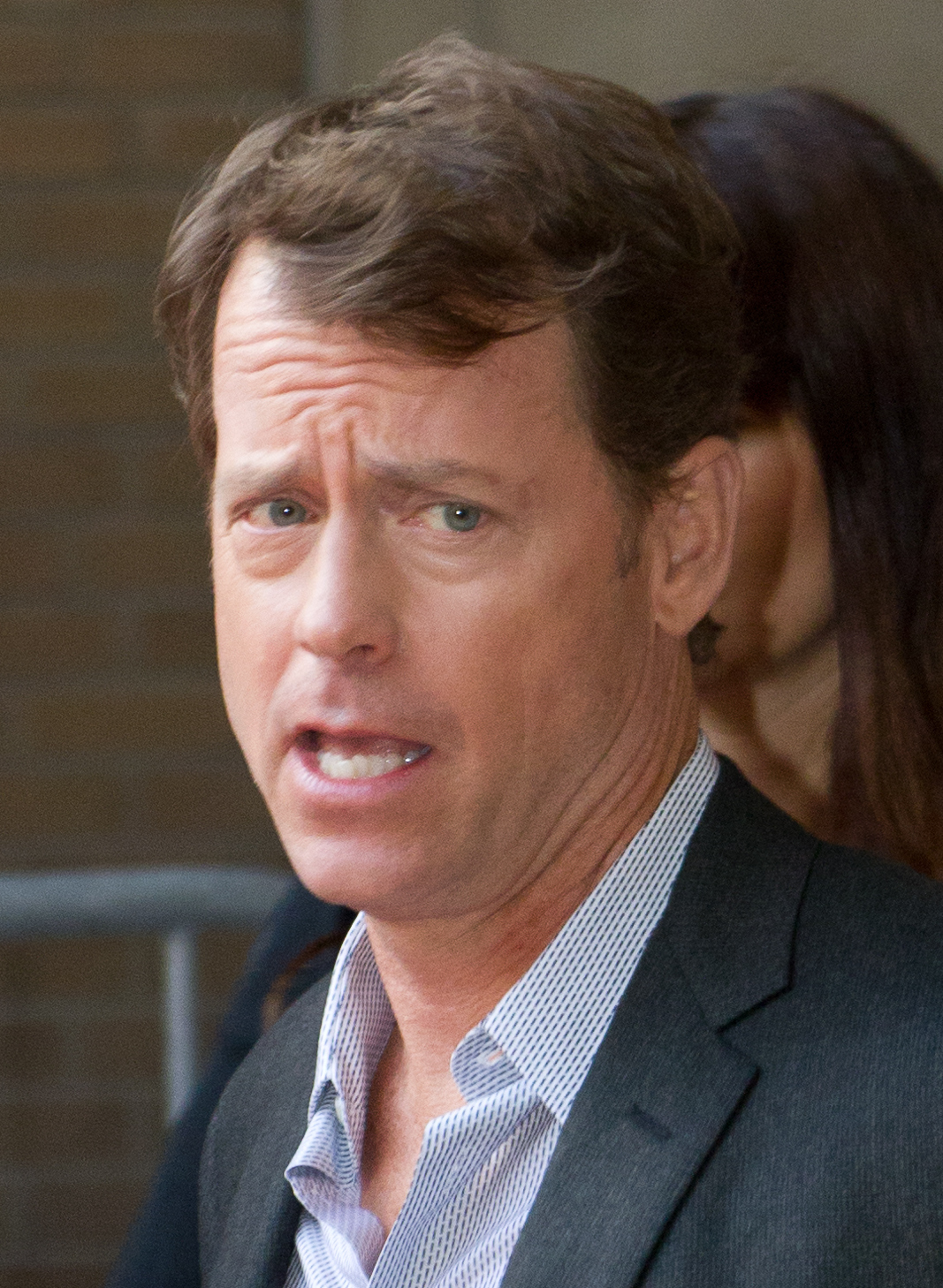
Diane Lane (left) and Greg Kinnear (right) were added to the main cast, leading the season alongside Wright and Kelly.

The firing of Kevin Spacey significantly affected the production process, as showrunners Frank Pugliese and Melissa Gibson had to rethink the show and come up with a conclusion for the series in a limited amount of time, taking into consideration other contractual obligations of the cast and crew. In an interview with IndieWire, Pugliese and Gibson revealed that these changes did not represent a huge shift for many of the characters; it was the overall story that was mostly affected, which was initially intended to center on a struggle between Frank and Claire to own the White House. The showrunners also revealed that—even in his absence—Frank continues to have a big impact on the story, and noted that erasing him completely would have seemed disingenuous.

In the wake of Spacey's firing, Wright leads the sixth season of House of Cards, with her character, Claire Underwood, having assumed the presidency at the end of the previous season. A number of returning cast members reprised their roles from previous seasons, while Alik Sakharov, who had helmed three episodes in season five, directed for the final season as well. New additions to the cast included Diane Lane and Greg Kinnear, who played Annette and Bill Shepherd, the sister-brother inheritors of an industrial conglomerate; said characters were inspired by the Koch brothers, as members of a family with the power to influence American politics. Joining them, Australian actor Cody Fern plays Annette's ambitious son Duncan Shepherd. Lane had been cast prior to the firing of Spacey, with whom she had shot a number of scenes. However, as she told IndieWire, the writers "managed to find the same trajectory for [her] character in terms of what she means to Claire."

== Cast and characters ==
=== Main ===
- Robin Wright as President Claire (Hale) Underwood
- Michael Kelly as Douglas "Doug" Stamper
- Diane Lane as Annette Shepherd
- Campbell Scott as Vice President Mark Usher
- Derek Cecil as Seth Grayson
- Cody Fern as Duncan Shepherd
- Athena Karkanis as Melody Cruz
- Jeremy Holm as FBI Assistant Director Nathan Green
- Greg Kinnear as Bill Shepherd
- Boris McGiver as Tom Hammerschmidt
- Constance Zimmer as Janine Skorsky
- Kristen Sieh as Press Secretary Kelsey Stewart
- Patricia Clarkson as Jane Davis
- Jayne Atkinson as Catherine "Cathy" Durant

=== Recurring ===
- Boris Kodjoe as Congressman, later Speaker of the House Brett Cole
- Linda Marie Larson as Jennifer Baumgarten
- Linda Powell as Secretary of State Marcy Siegerson
- Chip Zien as Dr. Charles Rosen
- Brian Keane as Ray Meyers
- Susan Pourfar as Secretary of Homeland Security Nora Cafferty
- Ron Canada as Judge Vincent Abruzzo
- Lars Mikkelsen as President Viktor Petrov
- Gregg Edelman as Stan Durant

=== Guest ===
- Chris Agos as USSS Special Agent Rick Bowman
- Robert Newman as EPA Administrator
- Joy Lynn Jacobs as U.S. Attorney
- Lee Sellars as Governor of Ohio Roger Olmstead
- Aaron Serotsky as Russell
- Darwin Shaw as Rafiq Nasser
- Sakina Jaffrey as Linda Vasquez
- John Ellison Conlee as a hunter
- Thomas Kopache as Earl Hanna
- Marc Kudisch as Henry Mitchell
- Willa Fitzgerald as 20-year-old Claire
- Ali Collier as teenager Claire
- David Corenswet as Reed
- Kenneth Tigar as Walter Doyle

== Episodes ==
No. overall	No. in season	Title	Directed by	Written by	Original release date	Prod. code
66	1	"Chapter 66"	Alik Sakharov	Melissa James Gibson & Frank Pugliese	November 2, 2018	HOC-621
Upon completion of her first one hundred days in the United States presidency, Claire faces public discontent and death threats via social media. With Frank having mysteriously died, she is in conflict with her husband's former financial sponsors, the wealthy siblings Annette and Bill Shepherd, who want Claire to sign a deregulation bill and stop backing a candidate they do not approve of. Regardless, Claire announces her support of the candidate in a public appearance. On the way home, a sniper takes a shot at the presidential limousine, and the round hits the bulletproof passenger window nearest Claire. Recognizing it as a warning, the assassination attempt makes her question whether Frank's death could have been a murder, as she confides in FBI agent Nathan Green. In a mental health facility, Doug Stamper continues to claim responsibility for the death of Zoe Barnes, but it is revealed that his therapist is secretly working for Claire.
67	2	"Chapter 67"	Ami Canaan Mann	Frank Pugliese & Melissa James Gibson	November 2, 2018	HOC-622
After a Shepherd-owned factory in Bellport has a chemical leak, Claire blackmails the governor into declaring a state of emergency. In a ploy to embarrass the company's owners, Claire tours the town and talks with affected residents. Having been hired to work for the Shepherd Freedom Foundation, Seth Grayson tries to get citizens to sign up for a mobile app, which is managed by Annette's son Duncan, and will allow the Shepherds to secretly mine the data on people's phones. Doug calls the U.S. attorney general to recant his confession and makes a deal with the prosecutor to go after Claire. Doug is later visited by Claire in his house, where she asks him to help her eliminate Cathy Durant, as she remains a loose end, but he refuses. After threatening Claire over the contents of Frank's will, which she has been trying to keep a secret, Bill finally gets Claire to sign the bill.
68	3	"Chapter 68"	Stacie Passon	Charlotte Stoudt & Sharon Hoffman	November 2, 2018	HOC-623
Surprisingly, Judge Abruzzo is in the Oval Office seeking a position in the Supreme Court. Claire becomes increasingly frustrated at the attempts by the Shepherds to undermine her authority. She meets with Cathy Durant and, fearing that Durant may testify due to Bill Shepherd's influence, asks Doug to prevent Durant's testimony. Tom Hammerschmidt is frustrated that Frank Underwood's mysterious death is not being properly investigated and meets Doug, who reveals that Cole is running for Speaker. Meanwhile, Vice President Mark Usher is secretly having an affair with Annette, but she is the one in control. Claire decides she wants to speak with Annette directly instead of going through Mark. Annette tries to persuade Claire to consider Abruzzo, but Claire retaliates with information about her son Duncan. In a flashback, the young Claire and Annette are shown practicing ballet, sharing a marijuana joint, and falling about laughing. Doug sees the footage of LeAnn Harvey's car crash. Claire receives news that Cathy Durant is dead, and thanks Doug. Mark blackmails Claire with Tom Yates' dead body.
69	4	"Chapter 69"	Ernest Dickerson	Jerome Hairston & Tian Jun Gu	November 2, 2018	HOC-624
President Viktor Petrov of Russia is a surprise guest at Cathy Durant's funeral, and he discusses with Claire how the situation in Syria may be resolved but insinuates that she may not be the final decision maker. Linda Vasquez arrives at the funeral and threatens Doug and Claire. Doug demands a pardon for himself and Frank, but Claire says she cannot pardon Frank and leaves Doug hanging. Congressman Cole proudly showcases Doug Stamper as part of his team, and Claire proposes to give Cole the vice presidency for 2020 and the presidency in 2024. Claire makes a deal with Petrov, including that the Russian government takes the blame for Tom Yates' death. Jane Davis tries to influence Claire but without much effect. Tom Hammerschmidt brings Janine Skorsky back to Washington and continues to investigate the mysterious deaths surrounding the Underwoods, while Claire and Doug both wonder how exactly Catherine died. Seth informs Doug that Frank left him more than cuff links in his will. In the final scene it appears that Cathy is still alive and residing in France.
70	5	"Chapter 70"	Thomas Schlamme	Jason Horwitch & Charlotte Stoudt	November 2, 2018	HOC-625
Claire has not been seen in public for 3 weeks, prompting speculation about whether she is fit to be president. The Shepherds see this as an opportunity to invoke the 25th Amendment, section 4, which would make Usher the de facto president. Doug visits his former psychiatrist to retrieve Frank's will. He continues his investigation of Catherine Durant's death, discovering that she may still be alive. Hammerschmidt tracks down Rachel Posner's belongings, including a phone number which leads him to Doug. A worker reaches out to Janine claiming to have incriminating information on the Shepherds. Claire reaches out to Duncan Shepherd for his help, but when he refuses, she reveals that she knows he is not Annette's son. Annette retaliates by preparing to leak information about Claire's past abortion. Claire intercepts her cabinet just before they exercise the 25th Amendment, sacking them all and replacing them with an all-female cabinet.
71	6	"Chapter 71"	Louise Friedberg	Jason Horwitch & Jerome Hairston	November 2, 2018	HOC-626
Claire publicly addresses the personal scandal of her abortion and introduces her new cabinet. Jane Davis is abducted and is interviewed by Claire, who believes she had something to do with Catherine Durant's fate. Congressman Cole introduces Doug to Bill Shepherd, who makes him an offer to join him, but Doug refuses. Duncan returns home, furious at being lied to about his parentage, but Bill Shepherd no longer acknowledges him as a Shepherd. Janine is faxed documents about Shepherd wrongdoings in the Arcas Corporation. Claire denounces Usher to the FBI for the disappearance of Tom Yates. Doug and Tom Hammerschmidt meet, and Doug confirms he killed Rachel but refuses to confirm on the record that Frank killed Zoe, Russo, and LeAnn. In rapid succession, Tom Hammerschmidt, Catherine Durant, and Jane Davis are murdered. Doug confronts Claire about Frank's will, hoping to confirm he is the sole beneficiary and then secretly retrieves a memory chip from under the president's desk. However, Claire reveals that she is pregnant by Frank, which means that their child will receive the entire Underwood inheritance, leaving nothing for Doug.
72	7	"Chapter 72"	Alik Sakharov	Melissa James Gibson & Frank Pugliese	November 2, 2018	HOC-627
Four months later, Doug visits the location where he buried Rachel. Meanwhile, Claire is well-advanced in her pregnancy and reverts to her maiden name, Hale. It also appears that a doctor engaged by the Shepherds has tried to induce the birth early. Claire puts plans in motion to discredit Frank, even using Petrov's Russian troll factory to spread false rumors. She becomes increasingly autocratic and blackmails Cole into convincing Abruzzo to recuse himself from signing a bill to reduce her powers. At the same time, Claire rallies public support to help combat her political enemies. After Duncan's arrest by the FBI for treason, Annette and Usher, who is no longer Vice President, plot the assassination of President Hale. The Shepherds and Janine separately approach Doug to help take down Claire, but he is unwilling to do so if it risks ruining Frank's legacy.
73	8	"Chapter 73"	Robin Wright	Frank Pugliese & Melissa James Gibson	November 2, 2018	HOC-628
Claire announces a new era of transparency in government at a press conference and further distances herself from Frank's actions. Meanwhile, Doug releases transcripts of Frank's audio recordings which cut Claire out of his will. Claire proposes to take action against suspected ICO terrorists possessing nuclear weapons, which alienates her war cabinet. Annette and Seth see Doug as the ideal person to dispose of Claire. Doug provides information about Rachel's whereabouts to Janine. After sending a copy of Frank's audio and letter opener to Claire, Doug visits her in the Oval Office where he admits that he killed Frank because he was undermining his own legacy. Doug threatens and wounds Claire with the letter opener, but when he draws back, she grabs it and stabs him in the stomach. As he lies bleeding on the floor, she covers his mouth and suffocates him.

== Marketing ==
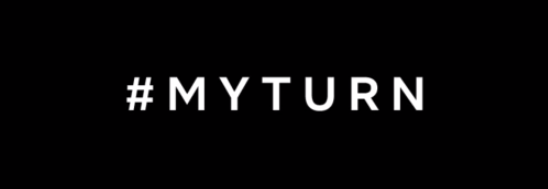
Promotional video intertitle – Wright's final words from season five were used to promote the final season, as the actress takes over lead duties following Spacey's firing.

External videos
- "House of Cards: Season 6"; The official trailer for the sixth season.

From March to October 2018, Netflix released various promotional material for the sixth and final season of House of Cards. On March 4, the first teaser premiered during the 90th Academy Awards ceremony. The teaser shows Robin Wright in the Oval Office as President Claire Underwood, declaring "We're just getting started," followed by an intertitle reading "Hail to the Chief". On June 10, Netflix released two first-look images from the final season. The first photo shows Wright listening to director Alik Sakharov, and the second shows her looking straight at the camera. On July 4, the 242nd anniversary of the adoption of the Declaration of Independence, a video message was posted on House of Cards' official Twitter account, with President Claire Underwood saying, "Happy Independence Day... to me." The message is followed by the hashtag #MyTurn.

On August 7, Netflix announced that the season would be released on November 2, 2018, and unveiled key art. The poster pays homage to the promotional image for the first season of the series, as Wright strikes the Lincoln Memorial pose, like Kevin Spacey had done before her. On August 27, four images were published via a press release, which depict new cast members Diane Lane, Greg Kinnear and Cody Fern in their roles as members of the Shepherd family. A teaser trailer released on September 5, revealed the fate of Frank Underwood, portrayed by Spacey who was fired from the show, months after the conclusion of the fifth season. It is shown that Frank died in 2017, and has been buried next to his father in South Carolina. Claire visits her husband's grave and says, "I'll tell you this though, Francis. When they bury me, it won't be in my backyard. And when they pay their respects, they'll have to wait in line." This speech mirrors the one Frank gives in the third season of the series, when he visits his father's grave. On September 27, Netflix released a new teaser trailer that presents several new and returning characters. Claire is shown dealing with the aftermath of her husband's death, and declaring that "the reign of the middle-aged white man is over." On October 8, Netflix released the official trailer for the season, which revolves around Claire's power struggle, as she clashes with the American oligarchs and tries to forge her own path as President of the United States. On October 23, critics began publishing reviews on the season, based on advance copies of the first five episodes that they had received from Netflix, after they had signed a letter of agreement.

== Reception ==
=== Critical response ===
Prior to the official release date of the season, Netflix sent the first five episodes to a number of critics, to serve as advance screeners. On Rotten Tomatoes, the season has an approval rating of 65% based on 68 reviews, with an average rating of 6/10. The consensus reads, "House of Cards folds slightly under the weight of its labyrinthian ending – thankfully Robin Wright's commanding performance is strong enough to keep it standing strong." On Metacritic, the season has a weighted average score of 62 out of 100, based on 23 critics, indicating "generally favorable" reviews.

Kevin Lever of FilmEra wrote that "with Wright at the forefront of the show now, House of Cards shines as it did in its early years." Lever described the production as "stellar" and the writing as "reinvigorated". He noted that the show still has the feel of previous years, but it works best when it focuses on Claire, instead of dealing with holdover pieces. David Zurawik of The Baltimore Sun wrote, "I love TV drama that speaks to the cultural moment the way this series does. And, as I have said over and over, #MeToo is a landmark moment." Zurawik revealed that the season primarily focuses on gender issues; "the evil of patriarchy and the stench of misogyny". He stated that the episodes exceeded his expectations, and praised the performances of Wright, Lane and Kinnear. Christopher Hooton of The Independent described the episodes as "slightly banal". He expressed his disappointment at the new characters that were introduced this season, and commented that "Frank Underwood has left behind not only a power vacuum but an entertainment one." Hooton noted that ever since Frank became president at the end of season two, the series has drifted directionless, and after watching the first five episodes of the final season, it still remains unclear what the show is actually about.

Negative reviews include one by Tyler Coates of Esquire, who writes: "Kevin Spacey's absence haunts the final season of House of Cards. Just as the show wouldn't work without Claire Underwood, it doesn't exactly work without Frank." Another by Sonia Saraiya of Vanity Fair writes: "House of Cards collapses – finally. Down a star and out of things to say, Season 6 flounders." Jack Seale of The Guardian rated the season 2 stars out of 5 stating, "We still need to talk about Kevin. It's impossible not to miss Spacey's presence as Robin Wright struggles to make her mark and save Netflix's first big show."

The series finale in particular was met with largely negative reviews. Scott Von Doviak of The A.V. Club gave the episode a "C−", praising Wright's direction but criticizing the writing and the characterization of Claire during the final season. Kyle Fowle of Entertainment Weekly gave the episode a "D" rating, saying the ultimate flaw of the season and the finale was the large focus on Frank and Frank's legacy. Emily VanDerWerff of Vox gave the finale a one-and-a-half star rating out of five, saying the season "saved the worst for last".

=== Accolades ===
For the 71st Primetime Emmy Awards, Robin Wright and Michael Kelly received nominations for Outstanding Lead Actress in a Drama Series and Outstanding Supporting Actor in a Drama Series, respectively.
