= House of Cards (American TV series) =

Political thriller television series (2013–2018)

- Genre: Political thriller; Conspiracy thriller
- Created by: Beau Willimon
- Based on: House of Cards by Michael Dobbs; House of Cards by Andrew Davies
- Showrunners: Beau Willimon; David Manson; Frank Pugliese; Melissa James Gibson
- Starring: Kevin Spacey; Robin Wright; Michael Kelly; (See full cast below)
- Music by: Jeff Beal
- Country of origin: United States
- Original language: English
- No. of seasons: 6
- No. of episodes: 73 (list of episodes)

Production
- Executive producers: David Fincher; Kevin Spacey; Eric Roth; Joshua Donen; Dana Brunetti; Andrew Davies; Michael Dobbs; John Melfi; Beau Willimon; David Manson; John David Coles; Robin Wright; Frank Pugliese; Melissa James Gibson
- Production locations: Baltimore, Maryland; Joppa, Maryland (sound stage)
- Cinematography: David M. Dunlap; Igor Martinovic; Eigil Bryld; Martin Ahlgren
- Editors: Lisa Bromwell; Byron Smith; Cindy Mollo
- Running time: 42–60 minutes
- Production companies: MRC (Note: Known as Media Rights Capital for the first season); Trigger Street Productions; Wade/Thomas Productions; Knight Takes King Productions

Original release
- Network: Netflix
- Release: February 1, 2013 – November 2, 2018

Related
- House of Cards

House of Cards is an American political thriller television series created by Beau Willimon for the streaming service Netflix. It is based on the 1989 novel of the same title by Michael Dobbs and an adaptation of the eponymous 1990 British television series by Andrew Davies, also from the novel. The first 13-episode season was released on February 1, 2013. House of Cards is the first TV series to have been produced by a studio for Netflix. It was also one of the first TV series that was released in a binge format where all the episodes were available simultaneously.

House of Cards is set in Washington, D.C., and is the story of Frank Underwood (Kevin Spacey), an immoral politician and Democrat from South Carolina's 5th congressional district and his equally ambitious wife Claire Underwood (Robin Wright). Frank is passed over for appointment as Secretary of State but remains House Majority Whip so he initiates an elaborate plan to attain power, aided by Claire. The series deals with themes of ruthless pragmatism, manipulation, betrayal, and power.

House of Cards received highly positive reviews and numerous award nominations, including 33 Primetime Emmy Award nominations, among them Outstanding Drama Series, Outstanding Lead Actor for Spacey, and Outstanding Lead Actress for Wright. It is the first original online-only streaming television series to receive major Emmy nominations. The show also earned eight Golden Globe Award nominations, with Wright winning for Best Actress – Television Series Drama in 2014 and Spacey winning for Best Actor – Television Series Drama in 2015.

In 2017, following allegations of sexual misconduct against Spacey, Netflix terminated its relationship with him. The sixth and final season was produced and released in 2018 without his involvement.

== Plot ==
Season	Episodes	Originally released
1	13	February 1, 2013
2	13	February 14, 2014
3	13	February 27, 2015
4	13	March 4, 2016
5	13	May 30, 2017
6	8	November 2, 2018

Frank Underwood (Kevin Spacey), a South Carolina congressman who is also one of the top Democrats in congress, is incensed when the newly elected president Garrett Walker (Michel Gill) reneges on his promise to make Frank the secretary of state in the new administration. With the help of his wife Claire (Robin Wright) and devoted chief of staff Doug Stamper (Michael Kelly), Frank attempts to influence all affairs surrounding the Walker administration. He also initiates a sexual relationship with reporter Zoe Barnes (Kate Mara), which he uses to manipulate the headlines and Zoe uses to obtain breaking stories. Frank shepherds an education bill through congress in an attempt to appear indispensable in the eyes of Walker. After the bill is passed, he masterminds a gubernatorial campaign in Pennsylvania with embattled congressman Peter Russo (Corey Stoll) as the candidate. The campaign implodes when Russo, an alcoholic, relapses and delivers a drunken interview. When Russo decides to come clean about his role in Underwood's schemes, Frank kills Russo and stages his death as a suicide. Firmly ingrained in Walker's inner circle, Frank suggests that dissatisfied Vice President Jim Matthews (Dan Ziskie), the former governor, return to his role in Pennsylvania. Although ultimately hesitant, Walker and Matthews agree. Frank is hopeful that Walker will select him as vice president, but Walker wants Underwood to vet billionaire Raymond Tusk (Gerald McRaney). In actuality, Tusk is enlisted to vet Frank and will only offer his recommendation to Walker if Frank agrees to influence affairs as vice president. Frank agrees to consider his proposals but makes no promises; Underwood is subsequently selected to become vice president.

Meanwhile, Zoe becomes suspicious regarding Frank's involvement in Russo's failed campaign. After confiding that Russo's death may have been a murder, Frank pushes Zoe in front of a subway train and she is killed instantly. The news devastates her colleagues, including Lucas Goodwin (Sebastian Arcelus) and Tom Hammerschmidt (Boris McGiver). Meanwhile, Underwood becomes vice president and sets out to diminish Tusk's influence over the president. In the midst of an energy crisis, Underwood proposes an aggressive trade policy with China. Tusk, who has significant business connections with the Chinese, is unwilling to cooperate with Walker and Underwood's policies and is shunned from the White House. Meanwhile, Republican candidates see a surge in campaign donations before the midterms. In actuality, this is the result of a money laundering operation out of a Missouri casino, with Tusk funneling Chinese money to Republican candidates. Frank is able to get the Chinese to stop the flow of money by having Walker agree to the building of a bridge in the U.S. He also seeks to neutralize Tusk by leaking the existence of the money laundering operation. The proximity to the White House creates an avalanche of controversy and solicitor general Heather Dunbar (Elizabeth Marvel) is assigned to investigate the administration's involvement. Walker finally realizes that Frank has implicated him in these dealings and alienates him from the White House. Tusk is issued a subpoena and ultimately lies that Walker had full knowledge of the money laundering operation, sensing that it would be more advantageous to him to align himself with Frank rather than Walker. With the House set to vote on Articles of Impeachment, Walker resigns and Underwood is sworn in as president.

Several months into his presidency, Frank appoints congressman Donald Blythe (Reed Birney) to be his vice president and jumpstarts an ambitious jobs program called America Works. Claire, dissatisfied with the position of first lady, wants a more substantive role and sets her eyes on the United Nations ambassador. Although her confirmation is rejected, Frank appoints her during a congressional recess session. The administration develops a Middle East peace plan that faces substantial opposition from Russian president Viktor Petrov (Lars Mikkelsen). The Underwoods visit Moscow and tensions flare when Claire publicly shames Petrov for his dictatorial stance on LGBT rights. When the Jordan Valley is thrust into chaos, Petrov insists that he will only remove his troops from the region if Claire resigns as ambassador. This further deepens the divide between the Underwoods, who have been estranged since the Moscow summit. Frank jumpstarts his campaign for the 2016 presidential election and must fight for the nomination against Heather Dunbar. Claire proves to be popular on the campaign trail but begins exhibiting unusual behavior as a result of her growing dissatisfaction. After confiding in Frank that she doesn't feel as if they are equals, Frank chastises her for not doing her job as first lady. The following morning, Claire tells Frank that she's leaving him.

Frank narrowly wins the Iowa caucus and departs to New Hampshire to campaign. Claire, meanwhile, heads to Texas and devises a plan with her new adviser LeAnn Harvey (Neve Campbell) to run for a congressional seat. At the State of the Union, Frank endorses Claire's opponent and kills any chances she may have in the race. In retaliation, Claire sabotages Frank's South Carolina campaign and he loses the primary to Dunbar. Claire proposes that she and Frank become a united front and he select her as his running mate; Frank is aghast at the proposal. While Claire threatens to go public with her intention for a divorce, Frank is shot at a campaign event by Lucas Goodwin. He is admitted to the hospital in critical condition and requires a liver transplant to survive. Vice President Blythe becomes acting president and relies heavily on Claire regarding an energy crisis with Russia. After Doug manipulates the organ donor list to put the president at the top, Frank recovers from surgery and whole-heartedly endorses Claire's plan to make her his running mate. Heather Dunbar drops out shortly after due to her connections to Goodwin. Tom Hammerschmidt, the former Washington Herald editor in chief, begins writing an article regarding Underwood's corruption and interviews several of Frank's former colleagues, including former president Walker. At the Democratic National Convention, Frank and Claire are nominated as the party's nominees for president and vice president respectively. They face off in the general election against charismatic Republican candidate Will Conway (Joel Kinnaman).

With weeks until the election, followers of the terror group ICO abduct a family in the U.S. and hold them hostage. Although Frank negotiates the release of two of the hostages, one of them is killed. Hammerschmidt uses the hostage situation to publish his article slamming Underwood as a corrupt president. With their chances at re-election almost totally diminished, the Underwoods pivot to using fear to influence voters. Frank demands that congress declare war on ICO and the Underwoods begin using questionable intelligence to justify enacting martial law in key areas before the election. On election day, it appears that Conway will most likely win. After an incident at a polling station in Tennessee, the Underwoods are able to get several states to suspend polling due to terror threats. Neither Conway nor Underwood receive a majority of electoral votes due to states abstaining from certifying their votes, giving the election to congress to decide. As January 20 approaches, the congressional election is inconclusive and vice president-elect Claire Underwood becomes acting president. The Underwoods are able to negotiate a set of new elections in the states that couldn't certify their votes; in these elections, the Underwoods prevail and Frank is sworn in as president almost a month after Inauguration Day. After snubbing him in his inaugural address, Congressman Alex Romero (James Martinez) uses his congressional committee to investigate the Underwood administration. Frank's misdeeds are slowly leaked in the press to Hammerschmidt. With growing talks regarding impeachment, Frank announces that he will resign.

Upon Frank's resignation, Claire is sworn in as president. She feels blindsided by his decision but he reveals that he orchestrated his downfall because the real power rests with the titans who own the politicians, and that the Underwoods can achieve true power with him in the private sector and her as president. Although she appears accepting of this partnership, she refuses to pardon him for his crimes and ultimately blacklists him from the White House. Months later, Frank is found dead of an apparent overdose of his liver medication. Doug still idolizes his former boss and tries to lobby Claire into issuing a posthumous pardon, an idea Claire is resistant to. Meanwhile, as president Claire is able to withstand several threats to her power from private industry magnates Bill and Annette Shepherd (Greg Kinnear and Diane Lane), including a failed try at the 25th amendment and an attempted assassination. However, Doug believes that Frank left him everything in his will. Claire informs him that whatever Frank left him belongs to his heir, and that she has artificially inseminated herself using Frank's sperm. Months later, a heavily pregnant Claire is widely popular with the American people. Doug learns that Frank changed his will last-minute and left Doug, among other things, an audio diary that implicates Claire in all of his misdeeds. Doug starts leaking excerpts, and Claire in retaliation floats the idea of a posthumous indictment for Frank. They agree to meet in the Oval Office to discuss a truce, but during a heated argument, Doug confesses to Frank's murder. Frank was intending to murder Claire and Doug killed him to protect his legacy. Doug becomes manic and attempts to stab Claire with a letter opener. Although he refrains from killing her, she stabs, suffocates, and cradles him as he dies; completely unaware that, thanks to Doug, journalist Janine Skorsky is going to expose her crimes.

== Cast and characters ==
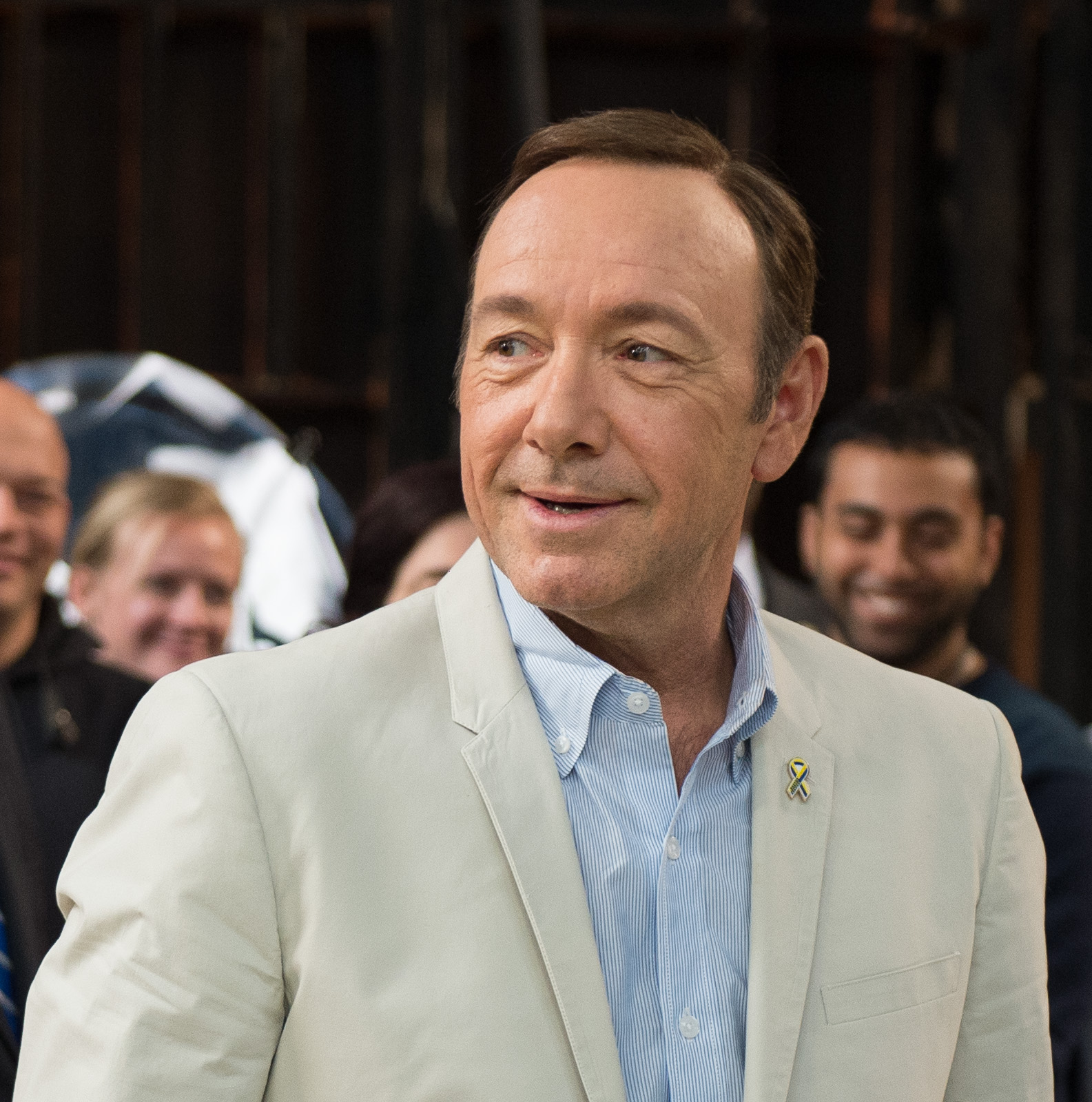
Kevin Spacey portrayed Francis "Frank" Underwood in seasons 1–5.

- Kevin Spacey as Francis J. "Frank" Underwood, a Democrat from South Carolina's 5th congressional district. He is House Majority Whip in season one, Vice President of the United States in season two, 46th President of the United States in seasons three to five, and the First Gentleman of the United States in season five.
- Robin Wright as Claire Underwood, Frank's wife. She runs the Clean Water Initiative, a nongovernmental organization, in season one before giving it up to become Second Lady of the United States in season two. She then becomes United States Ambassador to the United Nations in season three and First Lady of the United States in seasons three to five. In season five, she is briefly acting President of the United States before becoming Vice President of the United States and finally, becomes the 47th President of the United States at the end of the season.
- Michael Kelly as Douglas "Doug" Stamper, Underwood's unwaveringly loyal White House Chief of Staff and confidant. He is temporarily replaced by Remy Danton as chief of staff after his injury for most of season three, but returns as his new chief of staff at the end of the season.
- Jayne Atkinson as Catherine "Cathy" Durant, a Democratic Senator from Louisiana and Secretary of State.
- Corey Stoll as Peter Russo, a Democratic congressman from Pennsylvania's 1st congressional district and recovering addict. (season 1; guest season 4)
- Kate Mara as Zoe Barnes, a reporter for The Washington Herald (and later Slugline). She forms an intimate relationship with Frank Underwood, her political informant, who in turn uses her as a mouthpiece to leak stories to the press and irk his political rivals. (season 1; guest seasons 2 and 4)
- Sandrine Holt as Gillian Cole, the leader of a grass-roots organization called World Well that provides clean water to developing countries. (season 1; guest season 2)
- Kristen Connolly as Christina Gallagher, a congressional staffer and personal assistant to President Walker, and lover to Peter Russo. (seasons 1–2)
- Rachel Brosnahan as Rachel Posner, a prostitute trying to make a better life for herself using Stamper. (seasons 1–3)
- Sebastian Arcelus as Lucas Goodwin, an editor at The Washington Herald and later Zoe's boyfriend. (seasons 1–2 and 4)
- Mahershala Ali as Remy Danton, a lawyer for Glendon Hill and lobbyist who works for natural gas company SanCorp in season one and Raymond Tusk in season two. He worked in Underwood's congressional office as Communications Director prior to the series, and after severing ties with Tusk, serves as Underwood's chief of staff for most of season three until quitting at the end of the season. (seasons 1–4)
- Nathan Darrow as Edward Meechum, a member of the United States Capitol Police and the Underwoods' bodyguard and driver. (seasons 1–4)
- Reg E. Cathey as Freddy Hayes, the owner of Freddy's BBQ, and one of Underwood's few true friends and confidants. When Raymond Tusk exposes Freddy's criminal past, Freddy loses out on a franchise opportunity; he eventually gets and leaves a job as a White House groundskeeper. (seasons 1–4)
- Michel Gill as Garrett Walker, the 45th President of the United States, and former Governor of Colorado. He trusts Underwood as a close adviser and lieutenant, but remains blind to his machinations. (seasons 1–2, 4–5)
- Sakina Jaffrey as Linda Vasquez, President Walker's White House Chief of Staff. (seasons 1–2; guest season 6)
- Constance Zimmer as Janine Skorsky, a reporter for The Washington Herald. (seasons 1–2, 6; guest season 4)
- Gerald McRaney as Raymond Tusk, a billionaire businessman with a wide network of influence, although he prefers to live modestly. (seasons 1–2, 4–5)
- Boris McGiver as Tom Hammerschmidt, the editor-in-chief of The Washington Herald. He opens an investigation into the secret dealings of Frank and his inner circle in season four. (seasons 1–2, 4–6)
- Jimmi Simpson as Gavin Orsay, a computer hacker turned reluctant FBI informant who works secretly with Doug Stamper in exchange for help escaping the country. (seasons 2–3)
- Mozhan Marnò as Wall Street Telegraph reporter Ayla Sayyad. She is assigned to the White House and does freelance investigative reporting. (seasons 2–3)
- Molly Parker as Jacqueline "Jackie" Sharp, a Democratic congresswoman from California who succeeds Frank as majority whip. She also briefly runs for the Democratic nomination for president in season three. (seasons 2–4)
- Elizabeth Marvel as Heather Dunbar, a lawyer and Solicitor General of the United States in the Walker administration. She runs against Underwood for the Democratic nomination. (seasons 2–4)
- Derek Cecil as Seth Grayson, a political operative who becomes press secretary for Vice President Underwood through blackmail. (seasons 2–6)
- Paul Sparks as Thomas Yates, a successful author whom Frank asks to write a book about the America Works jobs program. He stays on as a speech writer and Claire's lover. (seasons 3–5)
- Kim Dickens as Kate Baldwin, the chief political reporter of the Wall Street Telegraph. She replaces Sayyad at the White House after Seth Grayson dismisses Sayyad for protocol violations. (seasons 3–5)
- Lars Mikkelsen as Viktor Petrov, the President of Russia. (seasons 3–6)
- Joel Kinnaman as Will Conway, the Republican Governor of New York and nominee for President of the United States running against Frank. (seasons 4–5)
- Neve Campbell as LeAnn Harvey, a Texas-based political consultant Claire hires to run her congressional campaign. She later becomes the campaign manager for the Underwoods for the 2016 election. (seasons 4–5)
- Dominique McElligott as Hannah Conway, the wife of New York Governor and Republican presidential nominee Will Conway. (seasons 4–5)
- Damian Young as Aidan Macallan, a data scientist and NSA contractor who is friends with LeAnn Harvey. (seasons 4–5)
- Korey Jackson as Sean Jeffries, a young reporter at the Washington Herald working under Hammerschmidt. (season 5)
- James Martinez as Alex Romero, a Democratic congressman who leads the House Intelligence Committee's investigation into Frank's alleged abuse of power. (season 5)
- Campbell Scott as Mark Usher, Conway's campaign manager. He later joins the Underwoods' inner circle as a "special advisor" and becomes the Vice President of the United States under Claire Underwood. (seasons 5–6)
- Patricia Clarkson as Jane Davis, Deputy Undersecretary of Commerce for international trade. She is very well connected and able to successfully negotiate back-channel dealings for the Underwoods. (seasons 5–6)
- Diane Lane as Annette Shepherd, a former childhood classmate of Claire's who is the co-head and public face of Shepherd Unlimited, a leading industrial conglomerate that has worked for years to shape and influence U.S. policy. (season 6)
- Greg Kinnear as Bill Shepherd, Annette's behind the scenes billionaire brother and co-head of Shepherd Unlimited that prefers to stay out of the limelight but is ruthless when it comes to playing politics to suit his business needs. (season 6)
- Cody Fern as Duncan Shepherd, Annette's ambitious and devoted son who represents the next generation of DC power players. (season 6)

== Production ==
=== Conception ===
The world of 7:30 on Tuesday nights, that's dead. A stake has been driven through its heart, its head has been cut off, and its mouth has been stuffed with garlic. The captive audience is gone. If you give people this opportunity to mainline all in one day, there's reason to believe they will do it.

— David Fincher

The series played a role as one of the earliest shows to launch in the "streaming era". Independent studio Media Rights Capital (MRC), founded by Mordecai Wiczyk and Asif Satchu, producer of films such as Babel, purchased the rights to House of Cards with the intention to create a series. While finishing production on his 2008 film The Curious Case of Benjamin Button, David Fincher's agent showed him House of Cards, a BBC series starring Ian Richardson. Fincher was interested in producing a potential series with Eric Roth. Fincher said that he was interested in doing television because of its long-form nature, adding that working in film does not allow for complex characterizations the way that television allows. "I felt for the past ten years that the best writing that was happening for actors was happening in television. And so I had been looking to do something that was longer form," Fincher stated.

MRC approached different networks about the series, including HBO, Showtime and AMC, but Netflix, hoping to launch its own original programming, outbid the other networks. Ted Sarandos, Netflix's chief content officer, looked at the data of Netflix users' streaming habits and concluded that there was an audience for Fincher and Spacey. "It looked incredibly promising," he said, "kind of the perfect storm of material and talent". In finding a writer to adapt the series, Fincher stated that they needed someone who could faithfully translate parliamentary politics to Washington." Beau Willimon, who has served as an aide to Chuck Schumer, Howard Dean and Hillary Clinton, was hired and completed the pilot script in early 2011. Willimon saw the opportunity to create an entirely new series from the original and deepen its overall story.

This is the future, streaming is the future. TV will not be TV in five years from now ... everyone will be streaming.

— Beau Willimon

The project was first announced in March 2011, with Kevin Spacey attached to star and serve as an executive producer. Fincher was announced as director for the first two episodes, from scripts by Willimon. Netflix ordered 26 episodes to air over two seasons.

Spacey called Netflix's model of publishing all episodes at once a "new perspective". He added that Netflix's commitment to two full seasons gave the series greater continuity. "We know exactly where we are going," he said. In a speech at the Edinburgh International Television Festival, he also noted that while other networks were interested in the show, they all wanted a pilot, whereas Netflix—relying solely on their statistics—ordered the series directly. In January 2016, show creator, executive producer and showrunner Beau Willimon's departure following season 4 was announced. He was replaced by Frank Pugliese and Melissa James Gibson, both of whom had begun writing for the series in season 3.

=== Casting ===
I was lucky to get into film at a time that was very interesting for drama. But if you look now, the focus is not on the same kind of films that were made in the 90s. When I look now, the most interesting plots, the most interesting characters, they are on TV.

— Kevin Spacey

Fincher stated that every main cast member was their first choice. In the first read through, he said "I want everybody here to know that you represent our first choice—each actor here represents our first choice for these characters. So do not fuck this up." Spacey, whose last regular television role was in the series Wiseguy, which ran from 1987 until 1990, responded positively to the script. He then played Richard III at The Old Vic, which Fincher said was "great training". Spacey supported the decision to release all of the episodes at once, believing that this type of release pattern will be increasingly common with television shows. He said, "When I ask my friends what they did with their weekend, they say, 'Oh, I stayed in and watched three seasons of Breaking Bad or it's two seasons of Game of Thrones." He was officially cast on March 18, 2011. Robin Wright was approached by Fincher to star in the series when they worked together in The Girl with the Dragon Tattoo. She was cast as Claire Underwood in June 2011. Kate Mara was cast as Zoe Barnes in early February 2012. Mara's sister, Rooney, worked with Fincher in The Girl with the Dragon Tattoo, and when Kate Mara read the part of Zoe, she "fell in love with the character" and asked her sister to "put in a word for me with Fincher." The next month, she got a call for an audition.

=== Filming ===
==== Locations ====
Principal photography for the first season began in January 2012 in Harford County, Maryland, on the Eastern seaboard of the United States. Filming of exterior scenes in 2013 centered primarily in and around the city of Baltimore, Maryland.

Among the numerous exteriors filmed in Baltimore, but set in Washington, D.C., are: Francis and Claire Underwood's residence, Zoe Barnes' apartment, Freddy's BBQ Rib Joint, The Clean Water Initiative building where Claire works, The Washington Herald offices, the Washington Opera House, the Secretary of State's building, Hotel Cotesworth, The Georgetown Hotel, Werner's Bar, Tio Pepe's, the DuPont Circle Bar, as well as scenes set in other locations, including Peter Russo's campaign rally in Pennsylvania and The Sentinel (military academy)'s Francis J. Underwood Library and Waldron Hall in South Carolina.

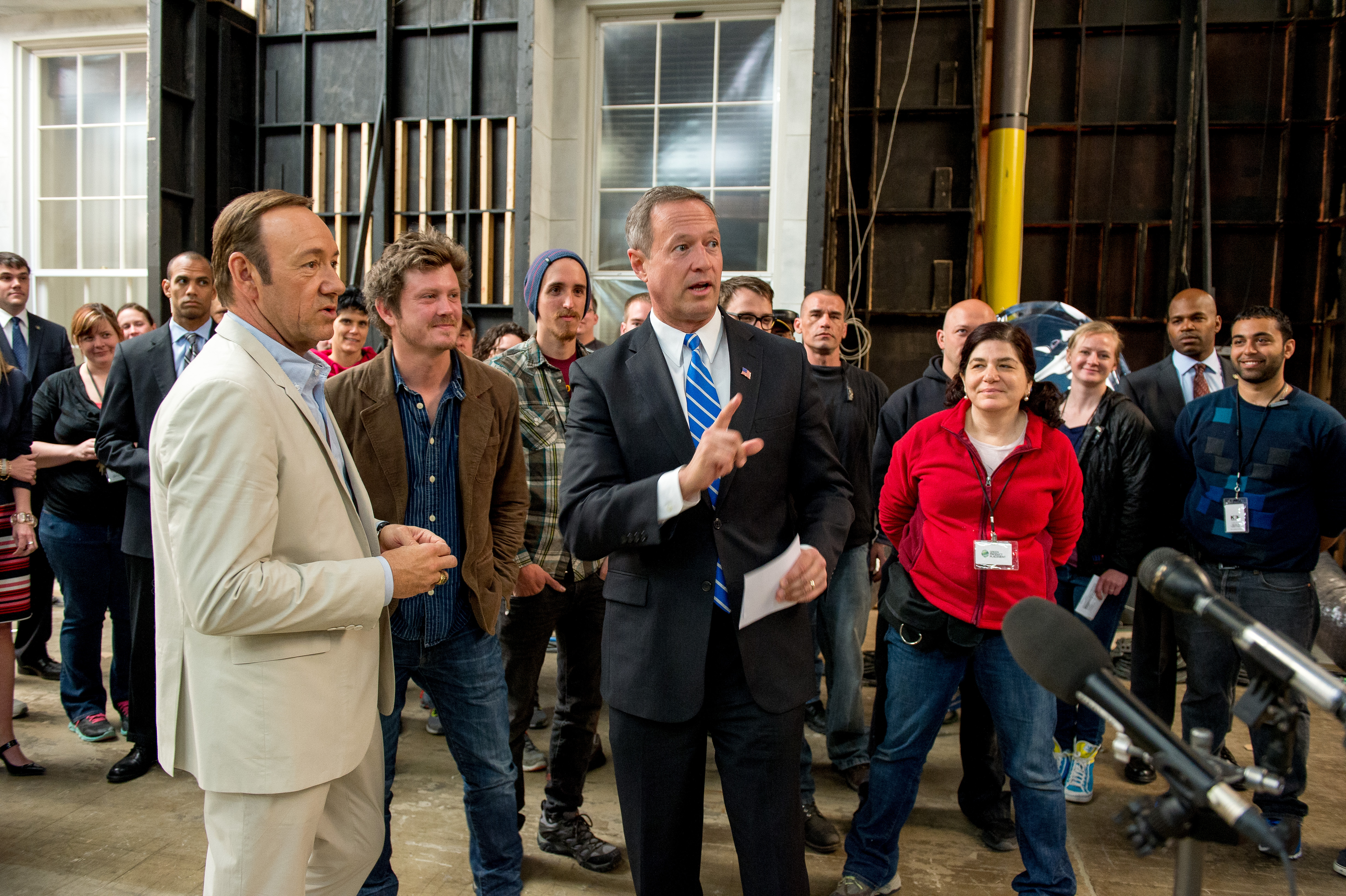
Maryland Governor Martin O'Malley visits the set of House of Cards at Joppa, Maryland, in 2013

Most of the interior scenes in House of Cards are filmed in a large industrial warehouse, which is located in Joppa, Maryland, also in Harford County, which is about 17 miles (27 km) northeast of Baltimore. The warehouse is used for the filming of some of the most iconic scenes of the series, such as the full-scale reconstruction of most of the West Wing of the White House, including the Oval Office, the Congressional offices and corridors, the large 'Slugline' open-plan office interior, and domestic interiors such as the large townhouse rooms of the Underwood residence and a large loft apartment. Extensive filming for season 5 was also done at the Maryland Historical Society in Mount Vernon, Baltimore.

The series uses green screen to augment the live action, inserting views of outdoor scenes in windows and broadcast images on TV monitors, often in post-production. The Production Designer, Steve Arnold, also describes in detail the use of a three-sided green screen to insert street scenes outside car windows, with synchronized LED screens above the car (and out of camera shot), that emit the appropriate light onto the actors and parts of the car, such as window frames: "All the driving in the show, anything inside the vehicle is done on stage, in a room that is a big three-sided green screen space. The car does not move, the actors are in the car, and the cameras are set up around them. We have very long strips of LED monitors hung above the car. We had a camera crew go to Washington, D.C., to drive around and shoot plates for what you see outside when you're driving. And that is fed into the LED screens above the car. So as the scene is progressing, the LED screens are synched up to emit interactive light to match the light conditions you see in the scenery you're driving past (that will be added in post). All the reflections on the car windows, the window frames and door jambs is being shot while we're shooting the actors in the car. Then in post the green screens are replaced with the synced up driving plates, and it works really well. It gives you the sense of light passing over the actors' faces, matching the lighting that is in the image of the plate".

In June 2014, filming of three episodes in the UN Security Council chamber was vetoed by Russia at the last minute. However the show was able to film in other parts of the UN Building. In August 2014, the show filmed a "mock-motorcade scene" in Washington, D.C. In December 2014, the show filmed in Española, Santa Fe, and Las Vegas, New Mexico.

==== Tax credits ====
According to the Maryland Film Office, the state provided millions in tax credits to subsidize the production costs.

- For season 1, the company received a final tax credit of $11.6 million. Production costs were $63 million, more than 1,800 Maryland businesses were involved, and nearly 2,200 Marylanders were hired with a $138 million economic impact.
- For season 2, the company was reported to expect to get a tax credit of about $15 million because filming costs were more than $55 million. There were nearly 2,000 Maryland businesses benefitting from the production and more than 3,700 Marylanders were hired with a $120 million estimated economic impact.
- For season 3, the company filed a letter of intent to film, and estimated costs and economic impact similar to season 2. Under the 2014 formula, "the show would qualify for up to $15 million in tax credits."

=== Final season and firing of Spacey ===
On October 11, 2017, The Baltimore Sun reported that House of Cards had been renewed for a sixth season and that filming would begin by the end of October 2017. On October 29, actor Anthony Rapp publicly stated that lead actor Spacey had made a sexual advance on him at a 1986 party when Rapp was 14. The following day, Netflix announced that the upcoming sixth season of House of Cards would be its last. Multiple sources stated that the decision to end the series was made prior to Rapp's accusation, but the announcement nevertheless caused suspicions for its timing. The following day, it was announced that production on the season would be temporarily suspended, according to an official joint statement from Netflix and MRC, "to give us time to review the current situation and to address any concerns of our cast and crew". On November 3, 2017, Netflix announced that they would no longer be associated with Spacey in any capacity whatsoever. On December 4, 2017, Ted Sarandos, Netflix's chief content officer, announced that production would restart in 2018 with Robin Wright in the lead, and revealed that the final season of the show would now consist of eight episodes. Spacey was removed from the cast and as executive producer with several unannounced projects involving the actor being canceled, resulting in Netflix losing 39 million dollars. In 2019, the last related criminal charges remaining against him were dropped.

On December 24, 2018, Spacey posted an unofficial short film titled Let Me Be Frank to his YouTube channel, in which, in-character as Francis "Frank" Underwood, he denied the allegations and stated that his character was not in fact dead. The video has been described in the media as "bizarre", "extraordinarily odd", "unsettling", and "alarming"; several actors—including Patricia Arquette, Ellen Barkin, and Rob Lowe—have criticized and ridiculed it on Twitter. As of September 2020, the video has over 12 million views, with 277,000 likes and 74,000 dislikes. Spacey posted a follow-up short film to Let Me Be Frank, titled KTWK (Kill Them with Kindness), to his YouTube channel on December 24, 2019. On Christmas Eve 2020, Spacey uploaded a third video, 1-800 XMAS, where he briefly addresses the audience as Frank before breaking character to address mental health issues coming from the COVID-19 pandemic, ending with a caption listing the National Suicide Prevention Hotline. After a three-year hiatus, Spacey released a fourth video, Being Frank with Tucker on Christmas Eve 2023 featuring conservative political commentator Tucker Carlson, presented as an episode of The Tucker Carlson Interview, where he addressed his exit from Netflix, media coverage, and the 2024 United States presidential election, as well as teasing a run for the presidency and breaking the fourth wall to privately address the audience as in the series.

On November 22, 2021, it was later reported that MRC sued Spacey for breaching his contract after losing millions from the reshooting the show's final season and was ordered to pay 31 million dollars in retribution. His lawyers later attempted to toss out the charge on January 25, 2022, by denying their accusations, but lost the court battle later that August after failing to convince the judge.

== Release ==
=== Broadcast ===
In Australia, where Netflix was not available prior to 2015, the series was broadcast on Showcase, premiering on May 7, 2013. Australian subscription TV provider Foxtel, and owner of Showcase, offered the entire first season to Showcase subscribers via their On Demand feature on Foxtel set-top boxes connected to the internet, as well as through their Xbox 360, Internet TV, and mobile (Foxtel Go) services. Although the entire season was made available, it maintained its weekly timeslot on Showcase. Season two returned to Showcase on February 15, 2014. As with season one, the entire season was made available on demand to Showcase subscribers while also retaining a weekly timeslot. The series has also been made available to non-Foxtel subscribers through Apple's Apple TV service. Prior to Netflix's Australian launch on March 28, 2015, Netflix renounced Showcase's rights to House of Cards, with season 3 premiering on Netflix at launch.

In New Zealand, where Netflix was unavailable prior to 2015, season 1 premiered on TV3 in early 2014, followed immediately by season 2. Netflix launched in New Zealand on March 24, 2015, and unlike Australia (which had Netflix launch on the same day) where House of Cards season 3 was available at launch, the series was initially unavailable.

In India, where Netflix was unavailable prior to January 2016, House of Cards premiered on February 20, 2014, on Zee Café. Seasons 1 and 2 were aired back-to-back. The channel aired all 13 episodes of season 3 on March 28 and 29, 2015. This marked the first time that an English-language general entertainment channel in India aired all episodes of the latest season of a series together. The move was intended to satisfy viewers' urge to binge-watch the season. Although Netflix launched in India in January 2016, House of Cards was not available on the service until March 4. All episodes of season 4 had their television premiere on Zee Café on March 12 and 13, 2016.

House of Cards was acquired by Canadian superstation CHCH for broadcast beginning September 13, 2017, making the program available throughout Canada on cable and free-to-air in CHCH's broadcast region, which includes portions of the United States. However, the show was removed from the CHCH primetime schedule two months later, following the sexual assault allegations towards Kevin Spacey.

House of Cards began airing in the United Kingdom on September 19, 2018, on Virgin TV Ultra HD, a newly established UHD/4K entertainment channel.

=== Home media ===
Season 1 was released on DVD and Blu-ray Disc by Sony Pictures Home Entertainment in region 1 on June 11, 2013, season 2 was released on June 17, 2014, season 3 was released on July 7, 2015, season 4 was released on July 5, 2016, season 5 was released on October 3, 2017, and season 6 was released on March 5, 2019.

Season	Cover	DVD release date			Blu-ray release date	
Season	Cover	Region 1	Region 2	Region 4	Region A	Region B
1	The Complete First Season; Volume One: Chapters 1–13	June 11, 2013	June 10, 2013	June 27, 2013	June 11, 2013	June 10, 2013
2	The Complete Second Season; Volume Two: Chapters 14–26	June 17, 2014	June 16, 2014	June 19, 2014	June 17, 2014	June 16, 2014
3	The Complete Third Season; Volume Three: Chapters 27–39	July 7, 2015	June 29, 2015	August 6, 2015	July 7, 2015	June 29, 2015
4	The Complete Fourth Season; Volume Four: Chapters 40–52	July 5, 2016	July 4, 2016	July 7, 2016	July 5, 2016	July 4, 2016
5	The Complete Fifth Season; Volume Five: Chapters 53–65	October 3, 2017	October 2, 2017	October 4, 2017	October 3, 2017	October 2, 2017
6	The Final Season; Volume Six: Chapters 66–73	March 5, 2019		March 13, 2019	March 5, 2019	

== Reception ==
=== Critical response ===
Critical response of House of Cards
Season	Rotten Tomatoes	Metacritic
1	87% (47 reviews)	76 (25 reviews)
2	83% (48 reviews)	80 (25 reviews)
3	73% (56 reviews)	76 (24 reviews)
4	86% (36 reviews)	76 (17 reviews)
5	72% (46 reviews)	60 (11 reviews)
6	65% (68 reviews)	62 (23 reviews)

==== Season 1 ====
The first season received positive reviews from critics. On Rotten Tomatoes, the first season holds a rating of 87%, based on 47 reviews, with an average rating of 8.1/10. The site's consensus reads, "Bolstered by strong performances—especially from Kevin Spacey—and surehanded direction, House of Cards is a slick, engrossing drama that may redefine how television is produced." On Metacritic, the first season has a score of 76 out of 100, based on 25 critics, indicating "generally favorable reviews".

USA Today critic Robert Bianco praised the series, particularly Spacey's and Wright's lead performances, stating "If you think network executives are nervous, imagine the actors who have to go up against that pair in the Emmys." Tom Gilatto of People Weekly lauded the first two episodes, calling them "cinematically rich, full of sleek, oily pools of darkness". In The Denver Post, critic Joanne Ostrow said the series is "[d]eeply cynical about human beings as well as politics and almost gleeful in its portrayal of limitless ambition". She added: "House of Cards is a wonderfully sour take on power and corruption."

Writing in The New York Times, critic Alessandra Stanley noted that the writing in the series sometimes fails to match the high quality of its acting: "Unfortunately Mr. Spacey's lines don't always live up to the subtle power of his performance; the writing isn't Shakespeare, or even Aaron Sorkin, and at times, it turns strangely trite." Nevertheless, she lauded House of Cards as an entertainment that "revels in the familiar but always entertaining underbelly of government". Andrew Davies, the writer of the original British TV series, stated that Spacey's character lacks the "charm" of Ian Richardson's, while The Independent praised Spacey's portrayal as a more "menacing" character, "hiding his rage behind Southern charm and old-fashioned courtesy." Randy Shaw, writing for The Huffington Post, criticized House of Cards for glorifying "union bashing and entitlement slashing within a political landscape whose absence of activist groups or anyone remotely progressive resembles a Republican fantasy world". Critics such as Time television critic James Poniewozik and Hank Stuever of The Washington Post compare the series to Boss. Like the British show and novel of the same name, many critics have noted that it is heavily influenced by both Macbeth and Richard III. In addition, some critics find elements of Othello, such as Iago's bitter ire.

==== Season 2 ====
The second season received positive reviews from critics. On Rotten Tomatoes the season has a rating of 83%, based on 48 reviews, with an average rating of 7.9/10. The site's critical consensus reads, "House of Cards proves just as bingeworthy in its second season, with more of the strong performances, writing, and visual design that made the first season so addictive." On Metacritic the season has a score of 80 out of 100, based on 25 critics, indicating "generally favorable reviews".

As the season progressed, reviews became more mixed. Jen Chaney of Vulture wrote that the second season "felt kind of empty" and that "the closest it came to feeling emotionally rich was when it focused on Claire". At the end of the second season, Alan Sepinwall of HitFix wrote that the show is a "ridiculous political potboiler that takes itself too seriously"; he gave the overall season a C−.

==== Season 3 ====
The third season received mostly positive reviews, although many critics noted it felt repetitive. On Rotten Tomatoes, the season has a rating of 73%, based on 56 reviews, with an average rating of 7/10. The site's consensus reads, "Season three introduces intriguing new political and personal elements to Frank Underwood's character, even if it feels like more of the same for some." On Metacritic, the season has a score of 76 out of 100, based on 24 critics, indicating "generally favorable reviews".

Negative reviews came from The Daily Beast's Nick Gillespie, who accused the writers of "descending into prosaic moralism" in season 3 and asserted that it deviates from the show's original intent, and Michael Wolff of USA Today plainly asserts that "the third season of House of Cards is no good ... not just no good, but incompetent, a shambles, lost". IndieWire named the season one of the most disappointing shows of 2015.

==== Season 4 ====
The fourth season received positive reviews from critics. On Rotten Tomatoes, the season has a rating of 86%, based on 36 reviews, with an average rating of 7.7/10. The site's critical consensus reads, "House of Cards retains its binge-worthiness by ratcheting up the drama, and deepening Robin Wright's role even further." On Metacritic, the season has a score of 76 out of 100, based on 17 critics, indicating "generally favorable reviews".

Ben Travers of IndieWire had a positive response to season four, calling it an upgrade from what he perceived as a "messy and unsatisfying melodramatic" third season, writing that "House of Cards is aiming at authenticity, and—for what feels like the first time—consistently finding it."

Emily Van DerWerff of Vox had a mixed review to season four, criticizing the repetitive and predictable nature of the series, writing: "There's no such mystery with House of Cards, where you know exactly what will happen as surely as you do on NCIS. Obstacles will present themselves, but Frank (the hammy Kevin Spacey) and Claire (the almost perfect Robin Wright) Underwood will overcome. What you see is what you get."

The choice to have Frank and Claire run as running mates was highly criticized by some reviewers. Jonathan Holmes of Radio Times wrote that "there are limits to the stupidity viewers are willing to accept, and with season four [House of Cards] may have stepped over the line. Claire demanding her selection as Frank's running mate is stupid. Moronic. It turns a canny political operator into a ham-brained fish-eyed jar-opener." Spencer Kornhaber of The Atlantic wrote that "in moments like this it's good to remember that Cards really, fundamentally is a stupid TV show instead of a particularly cunning comment on political reality."

==== Season 5 ====
The fifth season received mixed-to-positive reviews from critics. On Rotten Tomatoes, the season has an approval rating of 72% based on 46 reviews, with an average rating of 7.1/10. The site's critical consensus reads, "House of Cards enjoys a confident return to form this season, though its outlandish edge is tempered slightly by the current political climate." On Metacritic, the season has a score of 60 out of 100, based on 11 critics, indicating "mixed or average reviews".

After the fifth season received a Best Drama Series nomination at the 69th Primetime Emmy Awards, Brian Grubb of Uproxx wrote:

House of Cards has not been very good for multiple seasons now, if it was ever that good. I can understand the original excitement about it. Kevin Spacey and Robin Wright were on television. And not even "television", really. They were on a big budget series that was made for and by a streaming service. David Fincher was involved and even directed a few episodes. This was a borderline revolutionary development. ... I don't see how anyone who watched it can think it deserves a place in the best six or seven dramas on television.

==== Season 6 ====
The sixth season received mixed reviews from critics, with many expressing disappointment over Kevin Spacey's absence. On Rotten Tomatoes, the season has an approval rating of 65% based on 68 reviews, with an average rating of 6/10. The website's critical consensus reads, "House of Cards folds slightly under the weight of its labyrinthian ending—thankfully Robin Wright's commanding performance is strong enough to keep it standing strong." On Metacritic, the season has a score of 62 out of 100, based on 23 critics, indicating "generally favorable reviews". In the U.S., the average season 6 viewership dropped from 1.9 million to 1.5 for the first week compared to the previous season.

The last season has also received negative reviews, including those related to the absence of Kevin Spacey.

=== Accolades ===
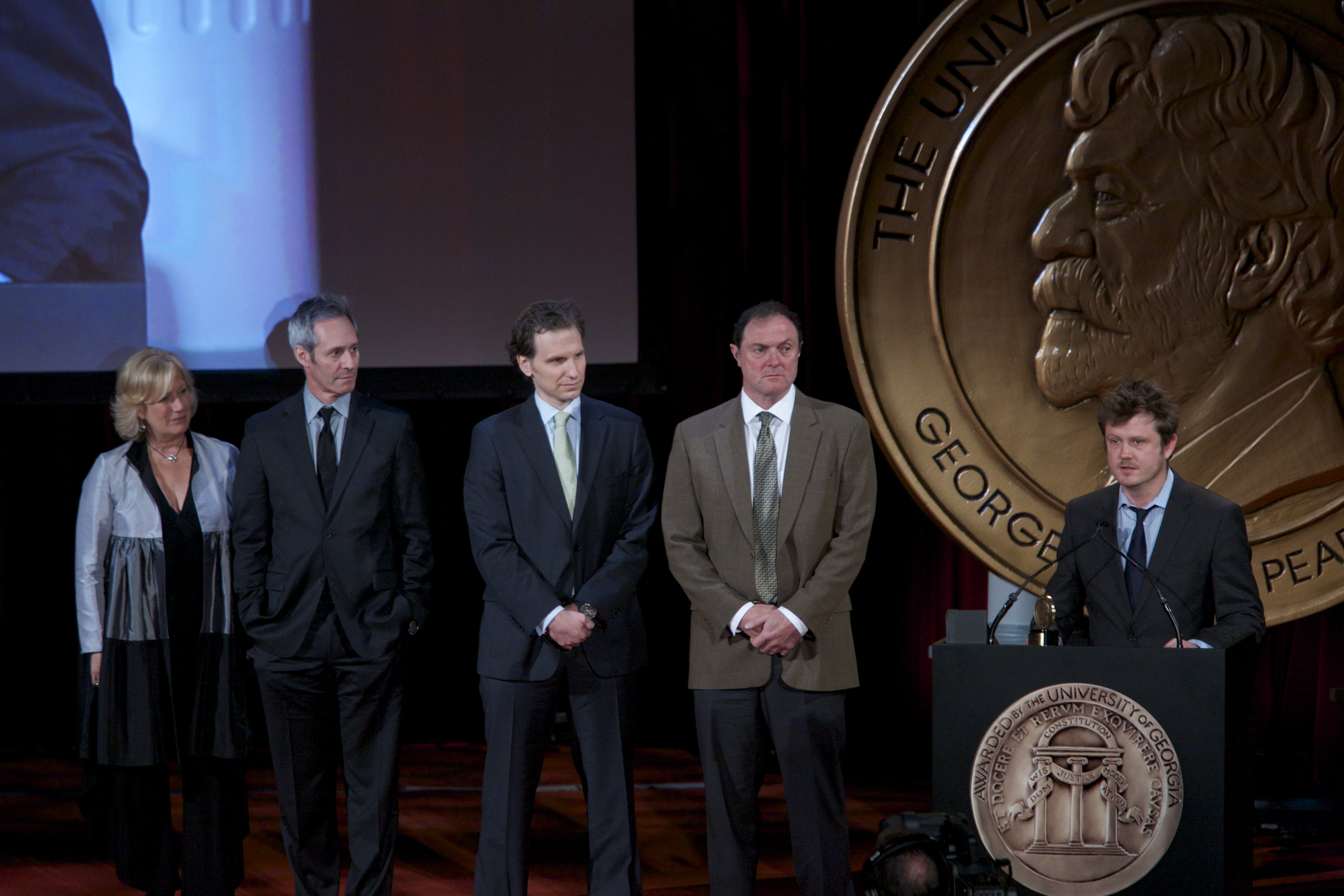
Beau Willimon with cast and crew at the 73rd Annual Peabody Awards

Across its run, House of Cards received 56 Primetime Emmy nominations (7 wins), eight Golden Globe nominations (two wins), and a 2013 Peabody Award.

For its first season, House of Cards received nine nominations for the 65th Primetime Emmy Awards in 2013, to become the first original online-only streaming television series to receive major nominations. Among House of Cards' nine nominations, "Chapter 1" received four nominations for the 65th Primetime Emmy Awards and 65th Primetime Creative Arts Emmy Awards becoming the first webisode (online-only episode) of a television series to receive a major Primetime Emmy Award nomination: Outstanding Directing for a Drama Series for David Fincher. This episode also received several Creative Arts Emmy Award nominations, including Outstanding Cinematography for a Single-Camera Series, Outstanding Single-Camera Picture Editing for a Drama Series, and Outstanding Music Composition for a Series (Original Dramatic). Although Primetime Emmy Award for Outstanding Lead Actor in a Drama Series is not a category that formally recognizes an episode, Spacey submitted "Chapter 1" for consideration to earn his nomination. At the Primetime Creative Arts Emmy Award presentation, "Chapter 1" and Eigil Bryld earned the Primetime Emmy Award for Outstanding Cinematography for a Single-Camera Series, making "Chapter 1" the first Emmy-awarded webisode. At the Primetime Emmy Awards ceremony, Fincher won for Outstanding Directing for a Drama Series for directing the pilot episode "Chapter 1" in addition to the pair of Creative Arts Emmy Awards, making "Chapter 1" the first Primetime Emmy-awarded webisode. None of the Emmy awards were considered to be in major categories.

For the 71st Golden Globe Awards, House of Cards received four nominations. Among those nominations was Wright for Golden Globe Award for Best Actress – Television Series Drama for her portrayal of Claire Underwood, which she won. In so doing she became the first actress to win a Golden Globe Award for an online-only streaming television series.

For its second season, House of Cards received 13 Primetime Emmy Award nominations, including Outstanding Drama Series, Kevin Spacey for Outstanding Lead Actor in a Drama Series, Robin Wright for Outstanding Lead Actress in a Drama Series, Kate Mara for Outstanding Guest Actress in a Drama Series, and Reg E. Cathey for Outstanding Guest Actor in a Drama Series. At the 72nd Golden Globe Awards, the series was nominated for Best Drama Series and Wright was nominated for Best Drama Actress, while Spacey won for Best Drama Actor.
