= Time of Death (2025 film) =

- Film poster
- Directed by: Will Wernick
- Written by: Jason Rosen
- Starring: Michael Kelly; Kevin Pollak; Dennis Haysbert; Mena Suvari
- Production company: Ikigai International
- Distributed by: Vertical
- Release dates: September 8, 2025 (Toronto International Film Festival); June 12, 2026 (United States)
- Running time: 107 minutes
- Country: United States
- Language: English

Time of Death (original title Closure) is a 2025 American psychological thriller mystery film written by Jason Rosen and directed by Will Wernick. It stars Michael Kelly, Kevin Pollak, Dennis Haysbert, and Mena Suvari.

== Synopsis ==
In December 1987 Frank Morley, a Department of Corrections officer still struggling with the deaths of his wife and child, investigates the mysterious disappearance of a prisoner from a decaying, isolated penitentiary.

== Cast ==
- Michael Kelly as Frank Morley
- Kevin Pollak as Warden Beau LaRue
- Dennis Haysbert as Officer Dale Aarons
- Mena Suvari as Dr. Alison Burrell
- Noel Gugliemi as Hector Ramos

== Production ==
The film was written by Jason Rosen and directed by Will Wernick. The project was originally titled Closure and later retitled Time of Death. The film was shot on location in and around Moundsville, West Virginia, including the former West Virginia Penitentiary. The prison's deteriorated condition was used to create the film's atmosphere.

== Release ==
The film premiered on September 8, 2025, under its original title Closure at the 2025 Toronto International Film Festival. In May 2026, it was announced that Vertical had acquired the film for release in the United States. It was released in select theaters and through video on demand on June 12, 2026.

== Reception ==
Cody Hamman of JoBlo.com gave the film a 7/10 rating, writing "I wasn't always entirely sure what was going on in Time of Death, as the film blurs reality, nightmares, visions, and flashbacks, but it all comes together in the end, and I was engaged every step of the way."
