= Randy Shaw =

American journalist

- Born: August 19, 1956; Los Angeles, California, United States
- Occupations: Attorney, author, activist

Randy Shaw is an attorney, author, and activist who lives in Berkeley, California. He is the executive director of the Tenderloin Housing Clinic, a nonprofit organization in San Francisco that he co-founded in 1980. He has also co-founded and is on the board of directors of Uptown Tenderloin, Inc., a nonprofit organization that spearheaded the creation of the national Uptown Tenderloin Historic District in 2009, and of the Tenderloin Museum, which opened in the spring of 2015. Shaw is also the editor of online news website Beyond Chron and an author focused on activism.

== Early activism ==
Working on tenants-rights campaigns in Berkeley led to his helping open the Tenderloin Housing Clinic (THC) in 1980. where Randy quickly became active in tenant rights, particularly the Tenderloin's struggles against luxury hotel development and the conversion of single-room occupancy hotels (SROs) for tourist use.

== Tenderloin Housing Clinic ==
Upon graduation from Hastings, Randy was awarded a $12,000 grant from the Berkeley Law Foundation, becoming THC's first full-time staff attorney and executive director.

THC currently leases and manages 23 SROs (over 1,800 units) for homeless single adults, and owns and manages the Galvin Apartments at 785 Brannan Street.

=== "Heat-less" hotel scandal ===
In 1982, the "heat-less hotel" scandal was exposed whereby thousands of San Francisco's SRO tenants were living without heat. The story was front-page news for a week, ultimately resulting in the emergency enactment of tough new heat and hot water laws, which he helped author.

=== Protecting low-cost housing ===
Shaw then went on to work with tenants on new police rules preventing illegal lockouts of tenants in lieu of legal evictions. In 1984, a campaign against Guenter Kaussen was launched. Kaussen was known as the "world's biggest slumlord". Overcharging rent to Cambodian immigrant tenants in the Tenderloin led media to investigating the West German-based real estate mogul. At the time, Guenter Kaussen was the Tenderloin's largest apartment owner; this led to a story on 60 Minutes CBS-TV February 3, 1985 and Kaussen's suicide.

=== New San Francisco homeless strategy ===
In 1988, Shaw proposed San Francisco to adopt a modified payments program (MPP), enabling homeless single adults receiving welfare to obtain permanent housing. He talked to hotel owners and found that many would be willing to charge rents affordable to welfare recipients if they could ensure rent payments. Under the MPP, welfare recipients agreed to have their checks "modified" so that THC was also named on the check. These two-party checks would be delivered to THC's offices, and THC would then deduct the rent from the check and give the tenant the balance.

The incoming mayor's (Art Agnos) administration implemented the MPP on a trial basis, so if it worked, the city would fund it. With a small grant obtained for THC to start the program in 1988, it proved successful. By 1989, over 1,000 formerly homeless single adults were living in permanent housing through enrolling in the MPP. The program is still used by housing providers throughout San Francisco's extensive supporting housing system today.

In May 1999, an innovative approach to housing homeless single adults was launched through the Department of Housing Services, called the hotel leasing program. THC became San Francisco's leading provider of permanent housing for homeless single adults, and the leasing program was the foundation of the San Francisco's Care Not Cash program, which began in 2004.

Uptown Tenderloin Historic District

Shaw led the effort to create the national Uptown Tenderloin Historic District. The Tenderloin now has 409 buildings on the National Register of Historic Places. Shaw’s team also arranged for the posting of historic plaques on nearly 100 of these buildings. They also arranged nine “Lost Landmark” plaques on sidewalks throughout the neighborhood.

== Legislation ==
In addition to helping author San Francisco's heat and hot water laws, key city ballot measures were drafted and state laws were strengthened to help rent-control and housing-code enforcement.

== National housing advocacy ==
In 1999, Housing America (HA) was founded to build national pressure for increased federal affordable housing funds and co-authored the study, There's No Place Like Home: How America's Housing Crisis, Threatens Our Children, which generated several widespread media coverage.

In 2000, There's No Place Like Home was authored for In These Times, which was a study on how the U.S. media ignore the nation's housing crisis was voted the 9th-most censored study for 2003 by Project Censored.

== As an author ==
Six books on activism and social change have been authored by Randy Shaw.

=== Generation Priced Out: Who Will Live in the New Urban America? ===
In 2018, he published a book on the urban housing crisis talking about how skyrocketing rents and home values are pricing the working and middle classes out of urban America. Several points he emphasizes in his book are:

- One can be both pro-tenant and pro-development.
- Single-family home zoning and owners are part of the problem.
- Building new housing does not make existing housing more expensive.
- Tech and other high-paid workers are not the problem.
- Housing markets are not free markets.

=== Beyond the Fields ===
Described by UFW community and labor organizer Fred Ross, Jr. as a "powerful and moving account of how the UFW transformed people's lives, instilling a lifetime commitment to social justice, Beyond the Fields: Cesar Chavez, the UFW and the Struggle for Justice in the 21st Century also traces the roots of Barack Obama's 2008 election outreach model to the UFW campaigns of the 1960s and 1970s, and the electoral strategies that UFW alumni brought with them to 21st-century campaigns.

=== Reclaiming America ===
Reclaiming America: Nike, Clean Air, and the New National Activism (UC Press 1999) argued that local activists needed to also focus on the national issues that increasingly shape local communities. Medea Benjamin, political activist and co-director of Global Exchange, said of the book, "Randy Shaw provides the definitive account of the historic national campaign to reform Nike's labor practices. Reclaiming America is a must read for everyone seeking to achieve greater social and economic fairness in the 21st century."

=== The Activist's Handbook: A Primer for the 1990s and Beyond ===
A guide to making social change happen, The Activist's Handbook: A Primer for the 1990s and Beyond(UC Press: 1996, 2001, 2013) is described by Howard Zinn as "enormously valuable for anyone interested in social change. It is practical in its advice, and inspiring in its stories of ordinary people successfully confronting powerful interests."

=== The Activist's Handbook, 2nd ed.: Winning Social Change in the 21st Century ===
A completely revised and updated edition of the original book, it brings the principles of activism into the Obama era. The book describes the tactics and strategies of immigrant rights, marriage equality, and other movements that grew in strength in the 21st century. This handbook is a book with legs. First published in the early 1990s, it has now been updated as a guide to "winning social change" in the new millennium.
