= Melissa James Gibson =

Canadian dramatist and screenwriter

Melissa James Gibson is a Canadian-born playwright and screenwriter based in New York.

== Life ==
The child of former BC Liberal MLA Gordon Gibson and journalist Valerie Gibson, Melissa James Gibson grew up in North Vancouver. She graduated from Columbia University and from the Yale School of Drama with an M.F.A. in Playwriting. After graduating, she worked as a college counselor at the exclusive arts-oriented Saint Ann's School in Brooklyn Heights, where her daughter, Celia Frey, graduated in 2017 and her son, Griffin Frey, is a current sophomore. She is working on commissions for the La Jolla Playhouse and The Adirondack Theatre Festival. She has received fellowships from the Jerome Foundation and the MacDowell Colony. The New York Times theatre critic Charles Isherwood wrote that, with her play This, Gibson “graduates into the theatrical big leagues with this beautifully conceived, confidently executed and wholly accessible work.”

She subsequently wrote episodes for The Americans and House of Cards, before joining Endeavor Content in an overall deal.

== Awards ==
- 2002 Obie for playwriting, Kesselring Prize, The Best Plays of 2001–02 for [sic]
- 2002 Whiting Award
- 2011 Steinberg Playwright Award

== Works ==
=== Theatre ===
- God's Paws (1993).
- Six Fugues (1995).
- [sic], Steppenwolf Theatre Company commission, New York Premiere: Soho Rep (2001).
- Suitcase, or Those That Resemble Flies From A Distance (NEA/ TCG Theatre Residency Program), Soho Rep (2004).
- Brooklyn Bridge, music by Barbara Brousal (The Children's Theater Company/New Dramatists Playground program commission) (2005).
- Current Nobody, Woolly Mammoth Theatre Company, DC, (2007).
- Nuda Veritas, Philadelphia Fringe Festival (2009).
- This, Playwrights Horizons, (2009). Canadian Premiere: Vancouver Playhouse, January 2011, directed by Amiel Gladstone.
- What Rhymes With America, Atlantic Theater Company (2012).
- Various episodes for the TV series The Americans (2013-2014).
- Placebo, Playwrights Horizons (2015).
- Given Fish (Steppenwolf Theatre Company commission, grants from the New York State Council on the Arts and the Greenwall Foundation).

=== Film ===
- All Is Bright (2013)

=== Television ===
Year	Title	Creator	Writer	Executive producer	Notes
2013–14	The Americans	No	Yes	No	
2016–18	House of Cards	No	Yes	Yes	
2022	Anatomy of a Scandal	Developer	Yes	Yes	
2027	The Savant †	Yes	Yes	Yes	
