= Frank Pugliese =

American TV writer and artistic director

Frank Pugliese is an American TV writer and artistic director. He won a WGA Award for the Homicide: Life on the Street episode "Night of the Dead Living." He is also a playwright. In 2017 Pugliese became the co-showrunner of House of Cards.

Pugliese's plays include: Aven'U Boys (Obie Award), The King of Connecticut, The Talk, The Alarm, Matty's Place, The Summer Winds, and "Hope" is the Thing with Feathers. His screenplays include: Aven' U Boys, 29th Street, Born to Run, Dion, Infamous, Shot in the Heart; and Italian.

== Publication ==
- Plays By Frank Pugliese, containing Aven'U Boys, "Hope" Is A Thing With Feathers & The Summer Winds, Broadway Play Publishing Inc.
