= Michael Kelly (actor) =

American actor (born 1969)

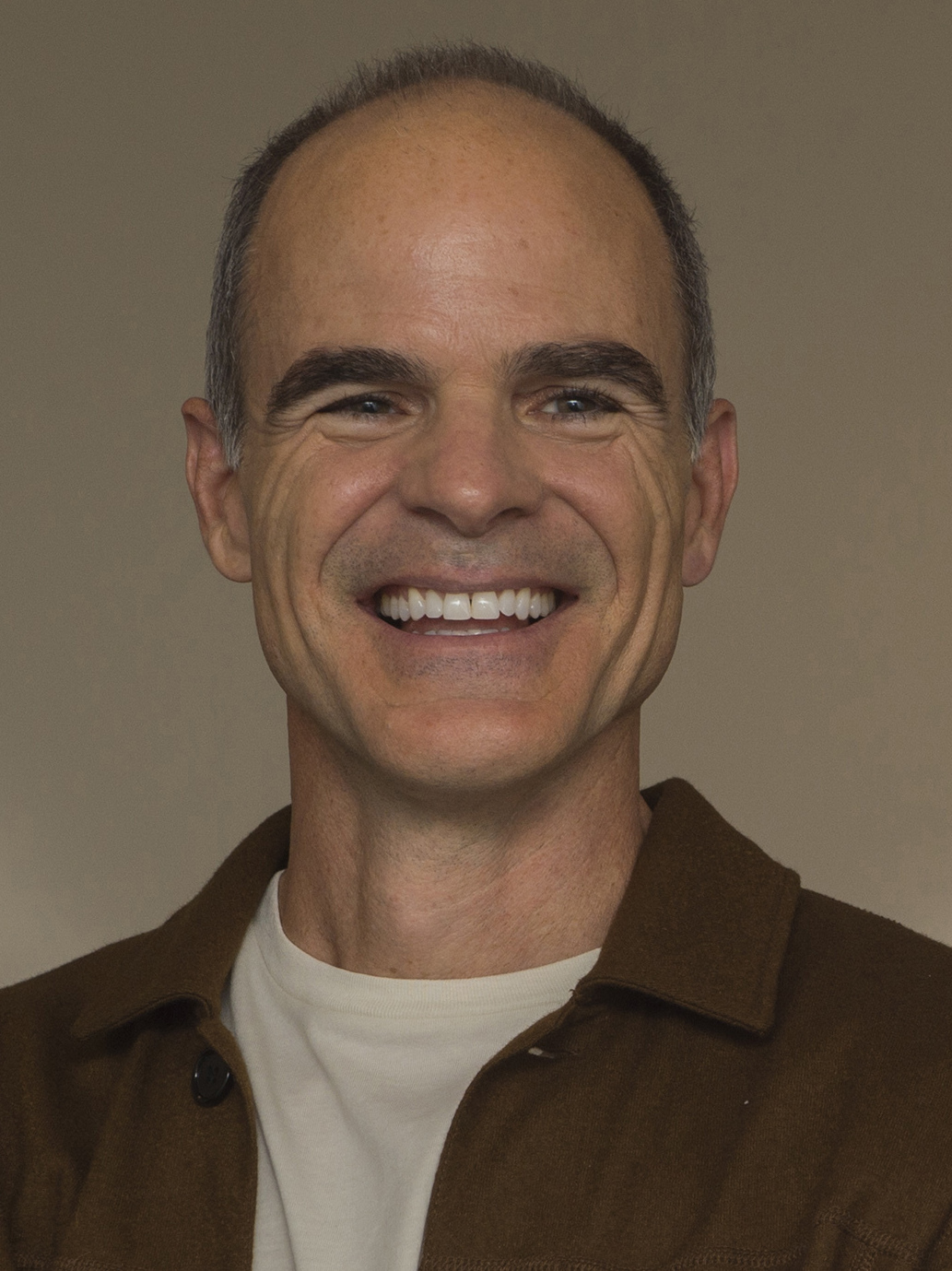
- Kelly in 2019
- Born: May 22, 1969 (age 57); Philadelphia, Pennsylvania, U.S.
- Education: Coastal Carolina University
- Occupation: Actor
- Years active: 1994–present
- Spouse: Karyn Mendel (m. 2005)
- Children: 2

Michael Kelly (born May 22, 1969) is an American actor, widely known for his role as Doug Stamper in the Netflix drama series House of Cards. He played a regular role as CIA Agent Mike November in the Prime Video thriller series Jack Ryan and reprised the role in Jack Ryan: Ghost War (2026). He also stars as CIA Deputy Director of Operations Byron Westfield on the Paramount+ spy series Lioness (2023–present) and appeared on The Sopranos as FBI Agent Ron Goddard. One of his most notable earlier roles in the horror community is that of "CJ" in Zack Snyder's 2004 remake of Dawn of The Dead.

== Early life and education ==
Kelly was born in Philadelphia, Pennsylvania, and grew up in Lawrenceville, Georgia, the son of Maureen and Michael Kelly. His father is of Irish descent, and his mother is of Italian ancestry. Kelly graduated from Coastal Carolina University in 1992 with a degree in performing arts.

== Career ==
In addition to playing Doug Stamper in all six seasons of House of Cards, Kelly has appeared in films such as Changeling, Dawn of the Dead, The Adjustment Bureau, Man of Steel, Chronicle, Now You See Me, and Everest. He also appeared in the television miniseries Generation Kill, six episodes of The Sopranos as Agent Ron Goddard, the Criminal Minds spin-off series Criminal Minds: Suspect Behavior, and as Dr. Edgar Dumbarton in Taboo.

== Personal life ==
Kelly resides in New York City. He and his wife Karyn married in 2005, and they have two children.

== Filmography ==
=== Film ===
Year	Title	Role	Notes
1998	Origin of the Species	Fisher	
1998	River Red	Frankie	
1999	Man on the Moon	Michael Kaufman	
2000	Unbreakable	Doctor Dubin	
2004	Dawn of the Dead	CJ	
2005	Loggerheads	George	
2005	Carlito's Way: Rise to Power	Rocco	Direct-to-DVD
2006	Out There	Mitchell	
2006	Invincible	Pete	
2007	Broken English	Guy	
2007	Zoe's Day	Dad	Short film
2007	Tooth & Nail	Viper	
2008	Changeling	Detective Lester Ybarra	
2008	The Narrows	Danny	
2008	Tenderness	Gary	
2009	Law Abiding Citizen	Bray	
2009	The Afterlight	Andrew	
2009	Defendor	Paul Carter	
2009	Did You Hear About the Morgans?	Vincent	
2010	Nice Tie, Italiano!	The American	Short film
2010	Fair Game	Jack	
2011	The Adjustment Bureau	Charlie Traynor	
2012	Chronicle	Richard Detmer	
2013	Now You See Me	Agent Fuller	
2013	Man of Steel	Steve Lombard	
2015	Everest	Jon Krakauer	
2015	Secret in Their Eyes	Reginald Siefert	
2016	Viral	Michael Drakeford	
2018	All Square	John Zbikowski	Also Producer
2021	Outside the Wire	Eckhart	
2023	Transformers: Rise of the Beasts	Agent Burke	Cameo
2024	Rob Peace	Edwin Leahy	
2025	Night Always Comes	Tommy	
2025	Time of Death	Frank Morley	
2026	Jack Ryan: Ghost War	Mike November	

=== Television ===
Year	Title	Role	Notes
1994	Lifestories: Families in Crisis	Gym Manager	Episode: "A Body to Die For: The Aaron Henry Story"
2000–01	Level 9	Wilbert 'Tibbs' Thibodeaux	12 episodes
2000	Law & Order: Special Victims Unit	Vet Tech Barry	Episode: "Slaves"
2001	Third Watch	Chip Waller	Episode: "The Relay"
2002	The Shield	Sean Taylor	Episode: "Dragonchasers"
2002	Law & Order: Special Victims Unit	Mark	Episode: "Disappearing Acts"
2002	Law & Order	Douglas Karell	Episode: "Asterisk"
2003	Judging Amy	Jack Barrett	Episode: "Just Say Oops"
2003	E.D.N.Y.	Anderson	Unsold TV pilot
2004	The Jury	Keen Dwyer	Episode "Last Rites"
2005	Kojak	Detective Bobby Crocker	9 episodes
2006–07	The Sopranos	Agent Ron Goddard	6 episodes
2006	Law & Order: Special Victims Unit	Luke Dixon	Episode: "Confrontation"
2007	CSI: Miami	Lucas Wade	Episode: "Born to Kill"
2008	Law & Order	Gary Talbot	Episode: "Falling"
2008	Generation Kill	Capt. Bryan Patterson	7 episodes
2008	Fringe	John Mosley	Episode: "The Arrival"
2009	Washingtonienne	Paul Movius	Unsold TV pilot
2010	Criminal Minds	Jonathan "Prophet" Sims	Episode: "The Fight"
2011	Law & Order: Criminal Intent	Terrence Brooks	Episode: "Boots on the Ground"
2011	Criminal Minds: Suspect Behavior	Jonathan "Prophet" Sims	13 episodes
2011	The Good Wife	Mickey Gunn	2 episodes
2011–13	Person of Interest	Mark Snow	7 episodes
2013–18	House of Cards	Douglas "Doug" Stamper	73 episodes Nominated—Primetime Emmy Award for Outstanding Supporting Actor in a Drama Series (2015–17, 2019); Nominated—Satellite Award for Best Supporting Actor – Series, Miniseries or Television Film; Nominated—Screen Actors Guild Award for Outstanding Performance by an Ensemble in a Drama Series (2015–16)
2016	Black Mirror	Arquette	Episode: "Men Against Fire"
2017	Taboo	Dr. Edgar Dumbarton	7 episodes
2017	The Long Road Home	Gary Volesky	6 episodes
2019–23	Jack Ryan	Mike November	20 episodes
2020	The Comey Rule	Andrew McCabe	2 episodes
2022–23	Pantheon	CEO, Van Leuwen, Air Force Officer, Angry Man (voices)	7 episodes
2023–present	Lioness	Byron Westfield	14 episodes
2024	The Penguin	Johnny Viti	5 episodes
