= Kevin Spacey on screen and stage =

Career of American actor

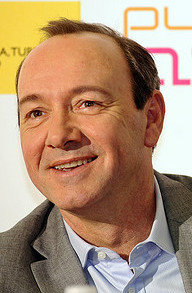
Spacey in November 2009

Kevin Spacey is an American actor who began his acting career on stage. His film career started in the late 1980s after small parts in Heartburn (1986) and Working Girl (1988). In the 90s, he had supporting roles in the films Glengarry Glen Ross (1992) and Iron Will (1994) before being cast in the role of Roger "Verbal" Kint in the 1995 The Usual Suspects which earned him an Academy Award for Best Supporting Actor. That same year he played serial killer and villain in Se7en opposite Brad Pitt and Morgan Freeman. He went on to star in L.A. Confidential (1997), Midnight in the Garden of Good and Evil (1997), The Negotiator (1998), voicing the grasshopper villain Hopper in A Bug's Life (1998), and American Beauty (1999). The latter earned him his second Academy Award, but this time for Best Actor.

In the 2000s, he appeared in the films Pay It Forward with Helen Hunt (2000), Superman Returns as Lex Luthor (2006), 21 with Jim Sturgess (2008), the latter which he also produced. In 2011, he co-starred with Paul Bettany and Jeremy Irons in the drama film Margin Call. That same year, he played antagonist Dave Harken in the comedy Horrible Bosses with Jason Bateman, a role he reprised in the 2014 sequel Horrible Bosses 2. He played Doc in the 2017 film Baby Driver with Ansel Elgort and Ron Levin in the 2018 film Billionaire Boys Club. From 2013-17, he starred as Frank Underwood in House of Cards.

== Film ==
Year	Title	Role	Director(s)	Notes
1986	Heartburn	Subway Thief	Mike Nichols	
1988	Working Girl	Bob Speck	Mike Nichols	
1988	Rocket Gibraltar	Dwayne Hanson	Daniel Petrie	
1989	See No Evil, Hear No Evil	Kirgo	Arthur Hiller	
1989	Dad	Mario	Gary David Goldberg	
1990	A Show of Force	Frank Curtin	Bruno Barreto	
1990	Henry & June	Richard Osborn	Philip Kaufman	
1992	Glengarry Glen Ross	John Williamson	James Foley	
1992	Consenting Adults	Eddy Otis	Alan J. Pakula	
1994	Iron Will	Harry Kingsley	Charles Haid	
1994	The Ref	Lloyd Chasseur	Ted Demme	
1994	Swimming with Sharks	Buddy Ackerman	George Huang	Also co-producer
1995	The Usual Suspects	Roger "Verbal" Kint	Bryan Singer	
1995	Outbreak	Casey Schuler	Wolfgang Petersen	
1995	Se7en	John Doe	David Fincher	
1996	A Time to Kill	Rufus Buckley	Joel Schumacher	
1996	Looking for Richard	Buckingham	Al Pacino	Documentary film
1996	Albino Alligator	—N/a	Himself	Directorial debut
1997	L.A. Confidential	Jack Vincennes	Curtis Hanson	
1997	Midnight in the Garden of Good and Evil	Jim Williams	Clint Eastwood	
1998	The Negotiator	Chris Sabian	F. Gary Gray	
1998	Hurlyburly	Mickey	Anthony Drazan	
1998	A Bug's Life	Hopper (voice)	John Lasseter	
1999	American Beauty	Lester Burnham	Sam Mendes	
1999	The Big Kahuna	Larry Mann	John Swanbeck	Also producer
2000	Ordinary Decent Criminal	Michael Lynch	Thaddeus O'Sullivan	Also producer
2000	Pay It Forward	Eugene Simonet	Mimi Leder	
2001	K-PAX	Prot / Robert Porter	Iain Softley	
2001	The Shipping News	Quoyle	Lasse Hallström	
2002	Austin Powers in Goldmember	Himself / Famous Dr. Evil; ('Austinpussy')	Jay Roach	Cameo
2003	The Life of David Gale	David Gale	Alan Parker	
2003	The United States of Leland	Albert T. Fitzgerald	Matthew Ryan Hoge	Also producer
2004	Beyond the Sea	Bobby Darin	Himself	Also director, producer and writer
2005	Edison	Levon Wallace	David J. Burke	Direct-to-video
2006	The Good Student	—N/a	David Ostry	Also executive producer
2006	The Sasquatch Gang	—N/a	Tim Skousen	Also producer
2006	Mini's First Time	—N/a	Nick Guthe	Also producer
2006	Superman Returns	Lex Luthor	Bryan Singer	
2007	Fred Claus	Clyde Northcut	David Dobkin	
2008	21	Mickey Rosa	Robert Luketic	Also producer
2008	Columbus Day	—N/a	Charles Burheister	Also producer
2008	Telstar: The Joe Meek Story	Major Wilfred Banks	Nick Moran	
2009	Moon	GERTY (voice)	Duncan Jones	
2009	Fanboys	—N/a	Kyle Newman	Also producer
2009	Shrink	Henry Carter	Jonas Pate	Also producer
2009	The Men Who Stare at Goats	Larry Hooper	Grant Heslov	
2010	Father of Invention	Robert Axle	Trent Cooper	Also producer
2010	Casino Jack	Jack Abramoff	George Hickenlooper	
2010	The Social Network	—N/a	David Fincher	Executive producer
2011	Margin Call	Sam Rogers	J.C. Chandor	
2011	Horrible Bosses	Dave Harken	Seth Gordon	
2011	Inseparable	Chuck	Dayyan Eng	Executive producer
2012	Envelope	Evgeniy Petrov	Aleksey Nuzhny	Short film
2012	Safe	—N/a	Boaz Yakin	Executive producer
2013	Captain Phillips	—N/a	Paul Greengrass	Executive producer
2014	Horrible Bosses 2	Dave Harken	Sean Anders	
2016	Elvis & Nixon	Richard Nixon	Liza Johnson	
2016	Nine Lives	Tom Brand / Mr. Fuzzypants	Barry Sonnenfeld	Also voice role
2017	Rebel in the Rye	Whit Burnett	Danny Strong	
2017	Baby Driver	Doc	Edgar Wright	
2018	Billionaire Boys Club	Ron Levin	James Cox	
2022	Once Upon a Time in Croatia	The Host	Jakov Sedlar	Docu-drama
2022	The Man Who Drew God	Police Detective	Franco Nero	Spacey is dubbed in Italian by Roberto Pedicini
2023	Control	The Voice	Gene Fallaize	Voice role
2024	Peter Five Eight	Peter	Michael Zaiko Hall	
2024	The Contract	The Devil	Massimo Paolucci	
2025	1780	Thomas	Dustin Fairbanks	
2026	Torrente for President	Leader of Illuminati	Santiago Segura	
2026	Holiguards Saga — The Portal of Force	Adel	Himself	Also director
TBA	The Awakening †	TBA	Matt Routledge	Post-production

== Television ==
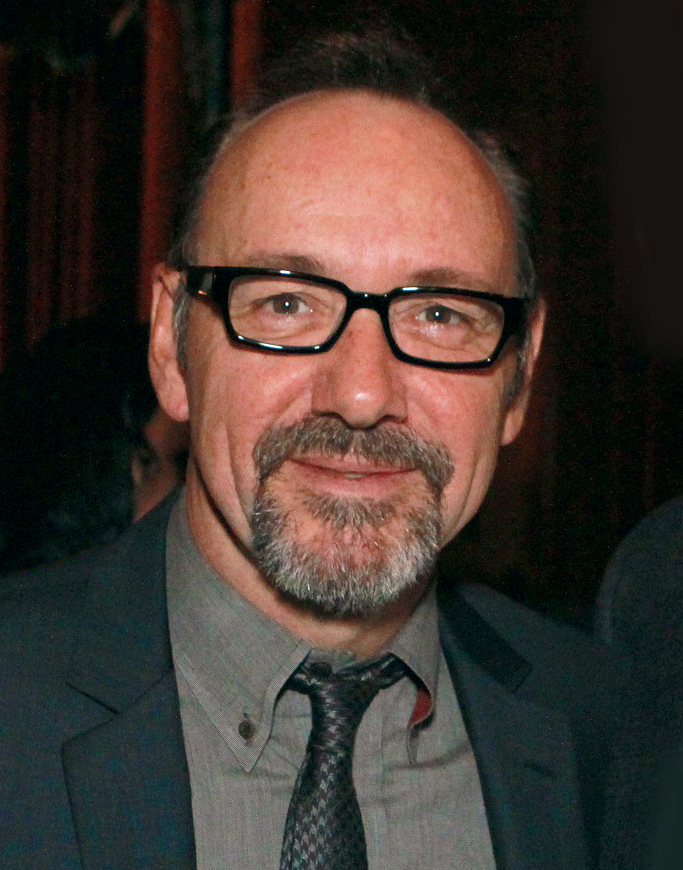
Spacey in 2011

Year	Title	Role	Notes
1987	The Equalizer	Detective Sgt. Cole	Episode: "Solo"
1987	Long Day's Journey into Night	James "Jamie" Tyrone Jr	Television film
1987	Crime Story	Senator Rourke	Episode: "The Senator, the Movie Star, and the Mob"
1988	The Murder of Mary Phagan	Wes Brent	Miniseries
1988	Wiseguy	Mel Profitt	7 episodes
1988	Unsub	Benton	Episode: "Clean Slate"
1990	When You Remember Me	Wade	Television film
1990	Fall from Grace	Jim Bakker	Television film
1991	Darrow	Clarence Darrow	Television film
1992	L.A. Law	Giles Keenan	Episode: "Guess Who's Coming To Murder"
1993	TriBeCa	Chris Boden	Episode: "Heros Exoletus"
1994	Doomsday Gun	Jim Price	Television film
1997, 2006	Saturday Night Live	Himself (host)	2 episodes
2003	Freedom: A History of Us	Various	6 episodes
2007	Bernard and Doris	—N/a	Television film; executive producer
2008	Recount	Ron Klain	Television film
2010	Gorilla School	Narrator (voice)	12 episodes
2012	Johnny Carson: King of Late Night	Narrator (voice)	American Masters documentary special, PBS
2013–2017	House of Cards	Francis "Frank" Underwood	65 episodes; also executive producer
2013	2014 Breakthrough Prize Ceremony	Himself (host)	Television special
2014	The Colbert Report	Frank Underwood	Episode: "1,394"
2016	Betrayed	—N/a	Miniseries; executive producer
2017	71st Tony Awards	Himself (host)	Television special
2017	Manhunt: Unabomber	—N/a	Miniseries; executive producer
2025–2026	Minimarket	Mentor Kevin	10 episodes

== Video games ==
Year	Title	Role	Notes
2006	Superman Returns	Lex Luthor (voice)	
2014	Call of Duty: Advanced Warfare	Jonathan Irons (voice)	Also motion capture

== Theatre ==
Year	Title	Role	Venues	Ref.
1981	Henry IV, Part 1	Messenger	Delacorte Theater, Off-Broadway	
1982	Ghosts	Oswald Alving	Brooks Atkinson Theatre, Broadway	
1983	The Misanthrope	Philinte	Seattle Repertory Theater	
1983	The Mousetrap	Sergeant Trotter	Barter Theatre, Abingdon/Fairfax, VA	
1984	Hurlyburly	Artie (replacement)	Ethel Barrymore Theatre, Broadway	
1985	The Seagull	Konstantin	The Kennedy Center, Washington D.C.	
1986	Long Day's Journey into Night	James Tyrone Jr.	Broadhurst Theatre, Broadway	
1988	Right Behind the Flag	Bernie	Playwrights Horizons, Off-Broadway	
1991	Lost in Yonkers	Louie	Richard Rogers Theatre, Broadway	
1993	Playland	Gideon Le Roux	New York City Center, Off-Broadway	
1999	The Iceman Cometh	Theodore "Hickey" Hickman	Brooks Atkinson Theatre, Broadway	
2005	Richard II	Richard II	Old Vic Theatre, London	
2005	National Anthems	Ben	Old Vic Theatre, London	
2005	The Philadelphia Story	Dexter	Old Vic Theatre, London	
2006	A Moon for the Misbegotten	Jim Tyrone	Old Vic Theatre, London	
2006	A Moon for the Misbegotten	Jim Tyrone	Brooks Atkinson Theatre, Broadway	
2008	Speed-the-Plow	Charlie Fox	Old Vic Theatre, London	
2009	Inherit the Wind	Henry Drummond	Old Vic Theatre, London	
2011	Richard III	Richard III	Old Vic Theatre, London	
2011	Richard III	Richard III	Ancient Theatre of Epidaurus	
2011	Richard III	Richard III	Hong Kong Arts Festival	
2011	Richard III	Richard III	Centro Niemeyer, Avilés	
2011	Richard III	Richard III	Istanbul Municipal Theatre	
2011	Richard III	Richard III	Curran Theatre, San Francisco	
2011	Richard III	Richard III	Singapore Repertory Theatre	
2011	Richard III	Richard III	Qatar National Convention Centre, Doha	
2012	Richard III	Richard III	Brooklyn Academy of Music, New York	
2015	Darrow	Clarence Darrow	Old Vic Theatre, London	
2017	Darrow	Clarence Darrow	Arthur Ashe Stadium, New York	
