= List of awards and nominations received by Kevin Spacey =

Kevin Spacey awards and nominations
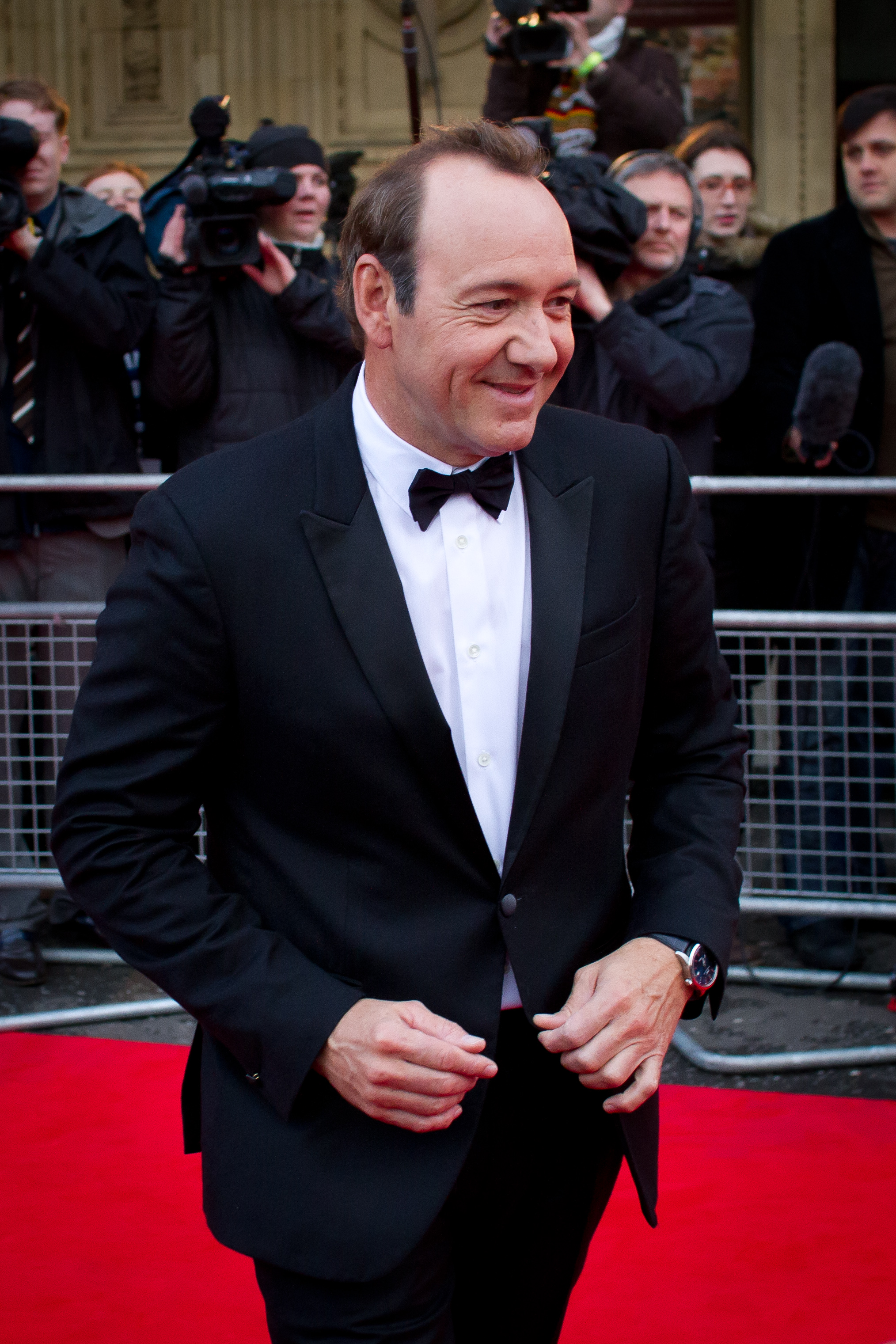
- Spacey at the Royal Albert Hall in 2011
Awards and nominations
Major Awards	Wins	Nominations
Academy Awards	2	2
BAFTA Awards	1	6
Golden Globe Awards	1	8
Grammy Awards	0	1
Primetime Emmy Awards	0	12
Screen Actors Guild Awards	4	11
Tony Awards	1	2
Wins	55
Nominations	81

The following is a list of awards and nominations received by Kevin Spacey, an American actor.

Over his decade-spanning career, Spacey has won two Academy Awards, a Tony Award, a BAFTA Award, and a Golden Globe Award. He was nominated for a Grammy Award as well as twelve Primetime Emmy Awards. Spacey received a star on the Hollywood Walk of Fame in 1999, and was named an honorary Commander and Knight Commander of the Order of the British Empire in 2010 and 2015, respectively.

Spacey won the Academy Award for Best Supporting Actor for his role as a crippled conman Roger "Verbal" Kint in the crime thriller The Usual Suspects (1995) and the Academy Award for Best Actor for playing Lester Burnham, a man going through a midlife crisis in the drama American Beauty (1999). On stage, he received the Tony Award for Best Featured Actor in a Play for his role in the Broadway play Lost in Yonkers (1991) by Neil Simon. He won the Laurence Olivier Award for Best Actor for his role in the West End production of The Iceman Cometh (1999).

He gained international acclaim for his portrayal of the ruthless politician Frank Underwood in the Netflix political drama series House of Cards (2013–2016). For his performance he received numerous accolades including a Golden Globe Award for Best Actor – Television Series Drama and two Screen Actors Guild Awards for Outstanding Actor in a Drama Series. He was also nominated for five consecutive Primetime Emmy Awards for Outstanding Lead Actor in a Drama Series and two Critics' Choice Television Awards for Best Actor in a Drama Series.

== Major associations ==
=== Academy Awards ===
Year	Category	Nominated work	Result	Ref.
1996	Best Supporting Actor	The Usual Suspects	Won	
2000	Best Actor	American Beauty	Won	

=== Emmy Awards ===
Year	Category	Nominated work	Result	Ref.
Primetime Emmy Awards
2008	Outstanding Lead Actor in a Limited Series or Movie	Recount	Nominated	
2008	Outstanding Television Movie	Bernard and Doris	Nominated	
2013	Outstanding Drama Series	House of Cards (season 1)	Nominated	
2013	Outstanding Lead Actor in a Drama Series	House of Cards (season 1)	Nominated	
2014	Outstanding Drama Series	House of Cards (season 2)	Nominated	
2014	Outstanding Lead Actor in a Drama Series	House of Cards (season 2)	Nominated	
2015	Outstanding Drama Series	House of Cards (season 3)	Nominated	
2015	Outstanding Lead Actor in a Drama Series	House of Cards (season 3)	Nominated	
2016	Outstanding Drama Series	House of Cards (season 4)	Nominated	
2016	Outstanding Lead Actor in a Drama Series	House of Cards (season 4)	Nominated	
2017	Outstanding Drama Series	House of Cards (season 5)	Nominated	
2017	Outstanding Lead Actor in a Drama Series	House of Cards (season 5)	Nominated	

=== Grammy Awards ===
Year	Category	Nominated work	Result	Ref.
2006	Best Compilation Soundtrack for Visual Media	Beyond the Sea	Nominated	

=== Tony Awards ===
Year	Category	Nominated work	Result	Ref.
1991	Best Featured Actor in a Play	Lost in Yonkers	Won	
1999	Best Leading Actor in a Play	The Iceman Cometh	Nominated	

== Industry awards ==
=== BAFTA Awards ===
Year	Category	Nominated work	Result	Ref.
British Academy Film Awards
1998	Best Film Actor in a Leading Role	L.A. Confidential	Nominated	
2000	Best Film Actor in a Leading Role	American Beauty	Won	
2002	Best Film Actor in a Leading Role	The Shipping News	Nominated	
British Academy Games Awards
2014	Performer	Call of Duty: Advanced Warfare	Nominated	
British Academy Television Awards
2014	Best International Programme (as producer)	House of Cards	Nominated	
2015	Best International Programme (as producer)	House of Cards	Nominated	

=== Critics' Choice Awards ===
Year	Category	Nominated work	Result	Ref.
Critics' Choice Movie Awards
1996	Best Supporting Actor	Se7en, The Usual Suspects, Outbreak, Swimming with Sharks	Won	
Critics' Choice Television Awards
2013	Best Actor in a Drama Series	House of Cards	Nominated	
2016	Best Actor in a Drama Series	House of Cards	Nominated	

=== Golden Globe Awards ===
Year	Category	Nominated work	Result	Ref.
1996	Best Supporting Actor – Motion Picture	The Usual Suspects	Nominated	
2000	Best Actor in a Motion Picture – Drama	American Beauty	Nominated	
2002	Best Actor in a Motion Picture – Drama	The Shipping News	Nominated	
2005	Best Actor in a Motion Picture – Musical or Comedy	Beyond the Sea	Nominated	
2009	Best Actor in a Miniseries or Motion Picture – Television	Recount	Nominated	
2011	Best Actor in a Motion Picture – Musical or Comedy	Casino Jack	Nominated	
2014	Best Actor in a Television Series – Drama	House of Cards	Nominated	
2015	Best Actor in a Television Series – Drama	House of Cards	Won	

=== Screen Actors Guild Award ===
Year	Category	Nominated work	Result	Ref.
1996	Outstanding Male Actor in a Supporting Role	The Usual Suspects	Nominated	
1998	Outstanding Cast in a Motion Picture	L.A. Confidential	Nominated	
2000	Outstanding Cast in a Motion Picture	American Beauty	Won	
2000	Outstanding Male Actor in a Leading Role	American Beauty	Won	
2009	Outstanding Male Actor in a Television Movie or Miniseries	Recount	Nominated	
2014	Outstanding Male Actor in a Drama Series	House of Cards (season 1)	Nominated	
2015	Outstanding Male Actor in a Drama Series	House of Cards (season 2)	Won	
2015	Outstanding Ensemble in a Drama Series	House of Cards (season 2)	Nominated	
2016	Outstanding Ensemble in a Drama Series	House of Cards (season 3)	Nominated	
2016	Outstanding Male Actor in a Drama Series	House of Cards (season 3)	Won	
2017	Outstanding Male Actor in a Drama Series	House of Cards (season 4)	Nominated	

=== Laurence Olivier Award ===
Year	Category	Nominated work	Result	Ref.
1999	Best Actor	The Iceman Cometh	Won	
2015	Society of London Theatre Special Award	—N/a	Won	

== Miscellaneous awards ==
=== Drama Desk Award ===
Year	Nominated work	Category	Result
1991	Lost in Yonkers	Outstanding Featured Actor in a Play	Won
2007	A Moon for the Misbegotten	Outstanding Actor in a Play	Nominated
2012	Richard III	Outstanding Actor in a Play	Nominated

=== MTV Movie & TV Awards ===
Year	Nominated work	Category	Result
1996	Se7en	Best Villain	Won

=== Outer Critics Circle Award ===
Year	Nominated work	Category	Result
1999	The Iceman Cometh	Outstanding Actor in a Play	Won

=== People's Choice Awards ===
Year	Nominated work	Category	Result
2017	House of Cards	Favorite Premium Series Actor	Nominated

=== Saturn Awards ===
Year	Nominated work	Category	Result
1993	Consenting Adults	Best Supporting Actor	Nominated
2002	K-PAX	Best Actor	Nominated

== Critics associations ==
Year	Category	Nominated work	Result
1992	Valladolid International Film Festival for Best Actor	Glengarry Glen Ross	Won
1995	Awards Circuit Community Award for Best Supporting Actor	The Usual Suspects	Won
1995	Boston Society of Film Critics Award for Best Supporting Actor	The Usual Suspects	Won
1995	Critics' Choice Movie Award for Best Supporting Actor	The Usual Suspects	Won
1995	New York Film Critics Circle Award for Best Supporting Actor	The Usual Suspects	Won
1995	National Board of Review Award for Best Supporting Actor	The Usual Suspects	Won
1995	Seattle International Film Festival Award for Best Actor	The Usual Suspects	Won
1995	Society of Texas Film Critics Award for Best Supporting Actor	The Usual Suspects	Won
1996	Chicago Film Critics Association Award for Best Supporting Actor	The Usual Suspects	Won
1996	Dallas-Fort Worth Film Critics Association Award for Best Supporting Actor	The Usual Suspects	Won
1997	Boston Society of Film Critics Award for Best Supporting Actor	L.A. Confidential	Won
1997	Society of Texas Film Critics Award for Best Supporting Actor	L.A. Confidential	Won
1998	Chicago Film Critics Association Award for Best Supporting Actor	L.A. Confidential	Nominated
1998	Empire Award for Best Actor	L.A. Confidential	Won
1999	Awards Circuit Community Award for Best Actor	American Beauty	Won
1999	Kansas City Film Critics Circle Award for Best Actor	American Beauty	Won
1999	San Diego Film Critics Society Award for Best Actor	American Beauty	Won
1999	Toronto Film Critics Association Award for Best Actor	American Beauty	Won
2000	American Comedy Award for Funniest Actor in a Motion Picture	American Beauty	Nominated
2000	Chicago Film Critics Association Award for Best Actor	American Beauty	Won
2000	Dallas-Fort Worth Film Critics Association Award for Best Actor	American Beauty	Won
2000	Florida Film Critics Circle Award for Best Actor	American Beauty	Won
2000	Jupiter Award for Best International Actor	American Beauty	Won
2000	Las Vegas Film Critics Society Award for Best Actor	American Beauty	Won
2000	London Film Critics Circle Award for Actor of the Year	American Beauty	Won
2000	Online Film & Television Association Award for Best Actor	American Beauty	Won
2000	Online Film Critics Society Award for Best Actor	American Beauty	Won
2000	Russian Guild of Film Critics Award for Best Foreign Actor	American Beauty	Won
2000	Satellite Award for Best Actor - Motion Picture Drama	American Beauty	Nominated
2000	Southeastern Film Critics Association Award for Best Actor	American Beauty	Won
2001	Empire Award for Best Actor	American Beauty	Nominated
2001	—N/a	Golden Apple Awards for Star of the Year	Won
2005	Palm Springs International Film Festival for Sonny Bono Visionary Award	—N/a	Won

== Honorary awards ==
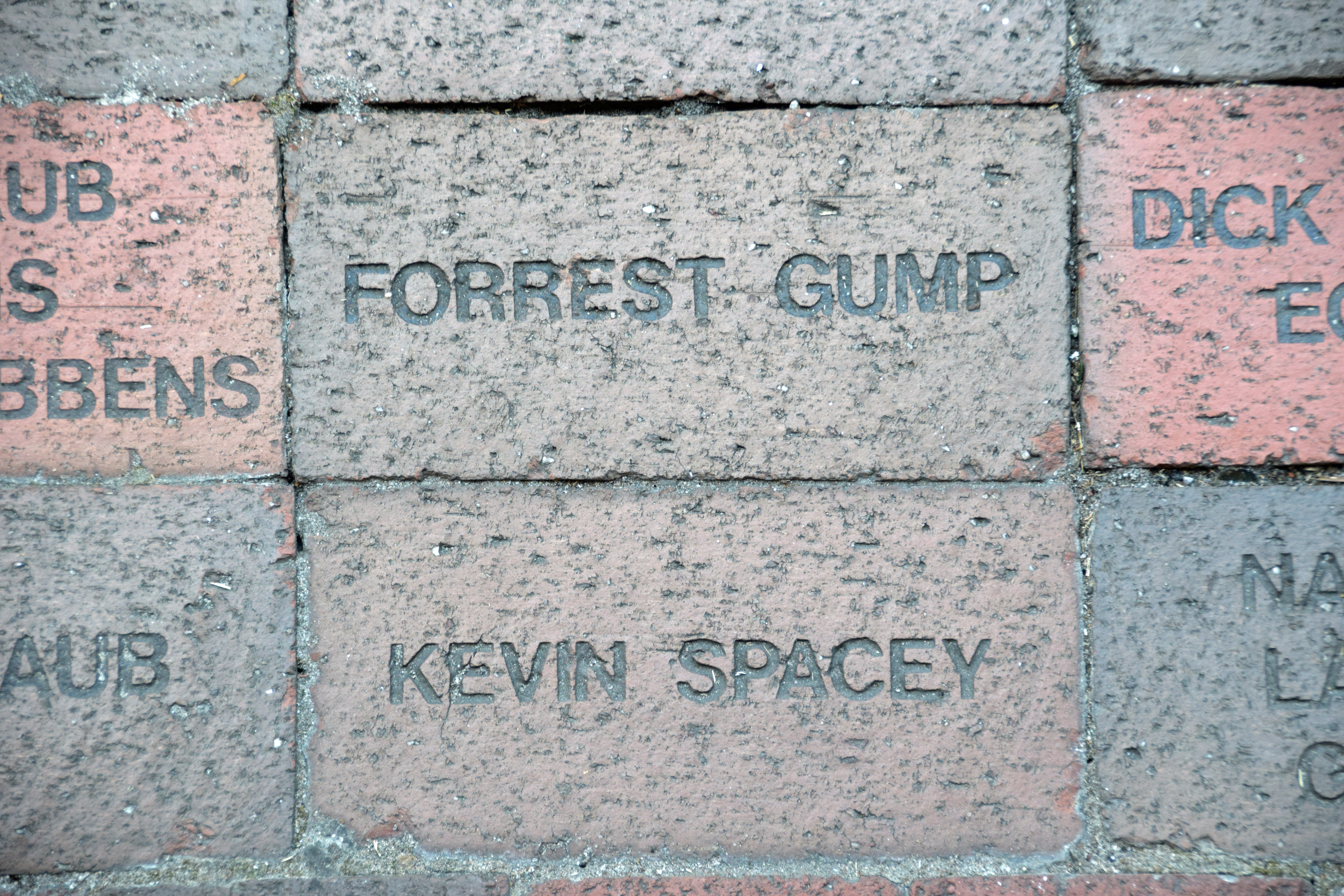
Spacey's brick in front of the Lucas Theater in Savannah, Georgia, US

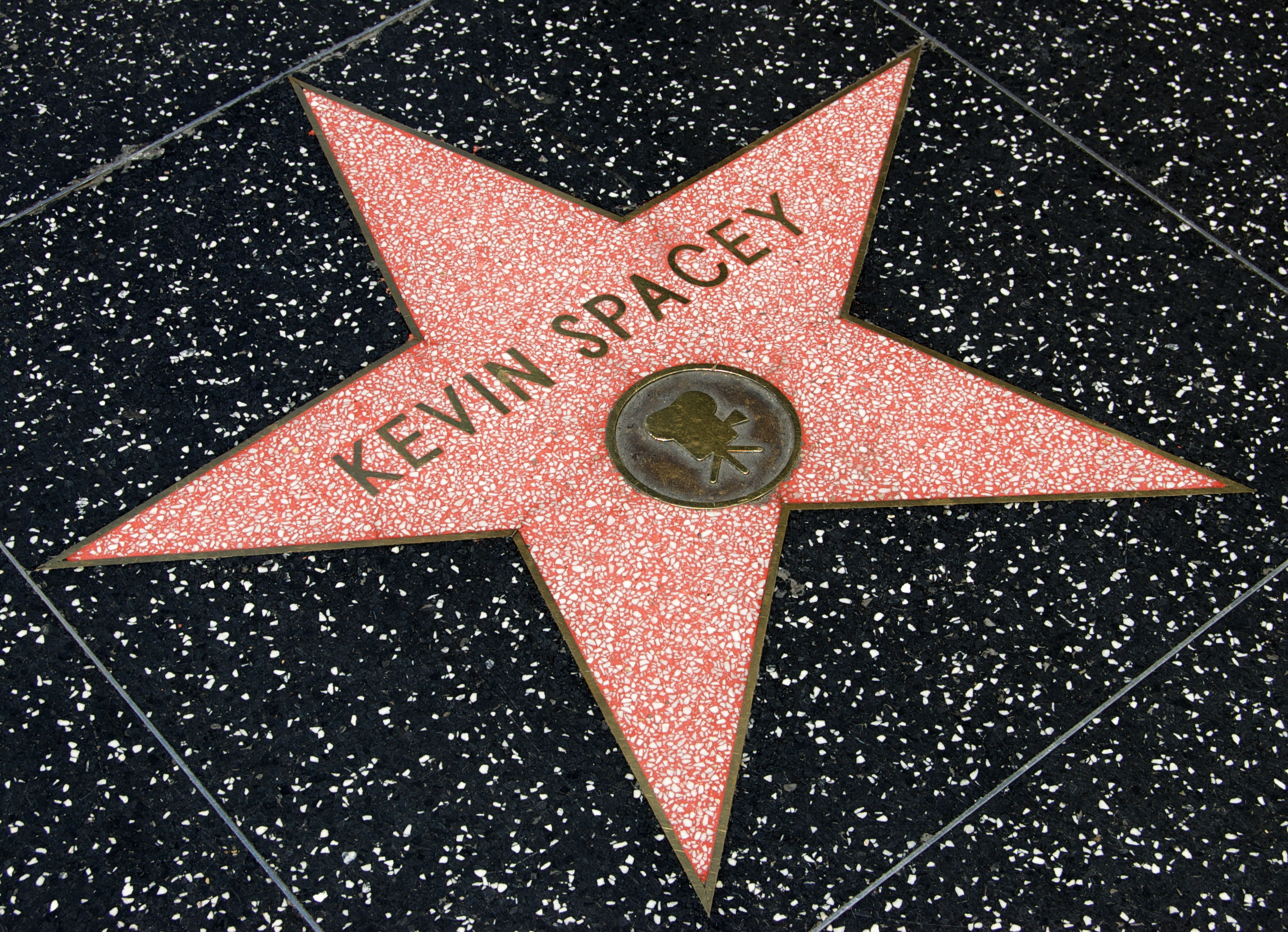
Spacey's star on the Hollywood Walk of Fame

Appointments

Country	Date	Appointment		Post-nominal letters
United Kingdom	3 November 2010	Honorary Commander	Order of the British Empire	CBE
United Kingdom	12 June 2015	Honorary Knight Commander	Order of the British Empire	KBE

In 1999, Spacey received a star on Hollywood Walk of Fame.

Spacey was awarded an honorary Doctor of Letters (Hon.Litt.D.) from the London South Bank University in November 2005.

In June 2008, he was appointed as Cameron Mackintosh Visiting Professor of Contemporary Theatre at St Catherine's College, Oxford, succeeding Patrick Stewart in the post. He was officially welcomed on October 13, 2008.

At the 2014 National Academy of Video Game Trade Reviewers (NAVGTR) awards Spacey won the Performance in a Drama, Lead for his performance in Call of Duty: Advanced Warfare.

In 2015, Spacey was awarded an honorary knighthood for his services to culture and British theater after finishing a 10-year run as artistic director at London's Old Vic theater.

On April 12, 2015, he received a Special Olivier Award recognising his contribution to British theatre during his eleven-year tenure as Artistic Director of The Old Vic.

The International Academy of Television Arts and Sciences decided that due to the sexual allegations brought up by Anthony Rapp, it would reverse its decision to honor Spacey with the 2017 International Emmy Founders Award.
