= See No Evil, Hear No Evil (film) =

1989 film by Arthur Hiller

- Theatrical release poster
- Directed by: Arthur Hiller
- Screenplay by: Earl Barret; Arne Sultan; Eliot Wald; Andrew Kurtzman; Gene Wilder
- Story by: Earl Barret; Arne Sultan; Marvin Worth
- Produced by: Marvin Worth
- Starring: Richard Pryor; Gene Wilder; Joan Severance; Anthony Zerbe
- Cinematography: Victor J. Kemper
- Edited by: Robert C. Jones
- Music by: Stewart Copeland
- Distributed by: Tri-Star Pictures
- Release date: May 12, 1989
- Running time: 103 minutes
- Country: United States
- Language: English
- Budget: $18 million
- Box office: $46.9 million

See No Evil, Hear No Evil is a 1989 American crime comedy film directed by Arthur Hiller. The film stars Gene Wilder as a deaf man and Richard Pryor as a blind man who work together to thwart a trio of murderous thieves. This is the third film of four films featuring Wilder and Pryor, who had appeared previously in the 1976 film Silver Streak and the 1980 film Stir Crazy. The film was released in the United States on May 12, 1989.

Released to a mixed to negative critical reception, See No Evil... was the comic duo's last financially successful film as a screen pairing. Their next film together, 1991's Another You, was a box office failure and critically savaged, and it proved to be the last collaboration of Wilder and Pryor.

== Plot ==
David "Dave" Lyons, a deaf man, and Wallace "Wally" Karew, a blind man, meet when Wally applies for a job in Dave's NYC concession shop. After a brief period of confusion and antagonism, they become close friends. Dave reads lips and guides Wally when they travel, and Wally tells Dave about invisible sources of sound and what people say behind his back.

After being hired at the shop, Wally waits outside for the day's newspapers. Meanwhile, a bookmaker to whom Wally owes money walks into Dave's shop with a briefcase. When the man is approached by a woman named Eve, he hides a gold coin from his suitcase in a coin dish. Eve takes the briefcase and shoots the man while Dave’s back is turned.

Dave does not see the shooting but notices Eve's legs as she leaves. Wally, who heard the gunshot, walks into the shop and trips over the dead body. Dave then rushes to help Wally and picks up the gun that Eve left behind. The police find them over the body with Dave holding the gun. As they are arrested, Wally picks up the day's collections from the coin dish and stashes them in his pocket.

At the police station, Dave and Wally are interrogated by Detective Captain Emile Braddock and Lieutenant Gatlin, who make them the prime suspects after they are unconvincing as witnesses. When Eve and her accomplice Kirgo – hoping to recover the coin – pose as attorneys to bail them out, Wally recognizes Eve's perfume and Dave her legs, but Braddock ignores them when they insist that she is the killer.

Dave and Wally escape from the police station, but the criminals soon find them. Eve takes the coin from Wally and calls her boss Mr. Sutherland for instructions, while Dave learns their plans by reading her lips. When Kirgo tries to kill them, they knock him unconscious.

They then steal an unattended police car, and Eve, Kirgo, and Braddock chase them. Working together to guide the patrol car, Dave and Wally evade their pursuers but accidentally launch the car onto a waterborne garbage barge.

After hiding the police car, they call Wally's sister Adele for help. The three then head for a resort mentioned in Eve's call to her boss. There, Wally impersonates a visiting professor. Meanwhile, Dave sneaks into Eve's room and steals the coin. Meanwhile, Adele distracts Kirgo by crashing her car into his. However, Kirgo and Eve discover the ruse, kidnap her, and take her to Sutherland's estate.

Arriving at the Sutherland estate, Dave and Wally free Adele but end up captured. In his study, Sutherland – who is also blind – reveals that the coin is an outer disguise for a sample of an extremely valuable material called a superconductor. Kirgo and Sutherland are killed during an argument over sharing the profits, after which Dave and Wally rescue Eve.

When the police arrive, Wally and Dave are cleared of the charges. Shortly thereafter, the two men reaffirm their friendship at a local park.

== Cast ==
- Gene Wilder as David "Dave" Lyons
- Richard Pryor as Wallace "Wally" Karew
- Joan Severance as Eve
- Kevin Spacey as Kirgo
- Alan North as Captain Emile Braddock
- Anthony Zerbe as Sutherland
- Louis Giambalvo as Lieutenant Gatlin
- Kirsten Childs as Adele Karew
- John Capodice as Scotto
- George Bartenieff as Huddelston
- Tonya Pinkins as Leslie
- Lauren Tom as Mitzie

== Production ==
Joseph Bologna and Renée Taylor wrote the first screenplay of the film and sold it to Columbia Pictures for $200,000 in 1984. They later sued the studio in the Los Angeles County Superior Court for $10 million in damages after being denied the promised additional $500,000 to be paid if Pryor were cast in the film, $25,000 per revision, and five-percent profit. Originally Jim Belushi was to be cast as the deaf man before Wilder was hired. Principal photography began on August 29, 1988, in New York and New Jersey, with New York City, Pound Ridge, and the Hackensack River marshlands serving as locations.

== Reception ==
=== Critical response ===
TriStar Pictures was looking to produce another film starring Wilder and Pryor, but Wilder would only agree to do See No Evil, Hear No Evil if he was allowed to re-write the script. The studio agreed and See No Evil, Hear No Evil premiered in May 1989 to mostly negative reviews.

Many critics praised Wilder's, Pryor's, and Kevin Spacey's performances, but they mostly agreed that the script was absolutely terrible. Roger Ebert of The Chicago Sun-Times called ranked the film one star out of a possible four, saying the interesting concept was spoiled by a "dumb plot" and uninspired "nice guy" performances from Pryor and Wilder when Ebert felt Pryor was more effective in roles showing a slightly abrasive edge. However, Ebert did praise Severance's "dry sense of humor" which he felt showed she was cast for acting talent as well as physical beauty. Similarly, Chris Hicks of Deseret Morning News described the film as "stupid" and failing to make the best of its stars' chemistry demonstrated to better effect in Silver Streak and Stir Crazy, with an "idiotic" script with a "contrived" story and "too many juvenile gags". On the other hand, Vincent Canby called it "by far the most successful co-starring vehicle for Mr. Pryor and Mr. Wilder", while also acknowledging that "this is not elegant movie making, and not all of the gags are equally clever."

The film holds a 29% rating on Rotten Tomatoes from 31 critics with the consensus: "A film whose title offers words to live by as well as a warning, See No Evil, Hear No Evil proves that even a brilliant comedy duo can team up for an unfunny dud." Despite the negative reviews, the film was a box office success, able to stay at number one for two weeks.

== See also ==
- Gene Wilder filmography
- Kevin Spacey filmography
- List of films featuring the deaf and hard of hearing
- Richard Pryor filmography
