= Kevin Spacey =

American actor (born 1959)

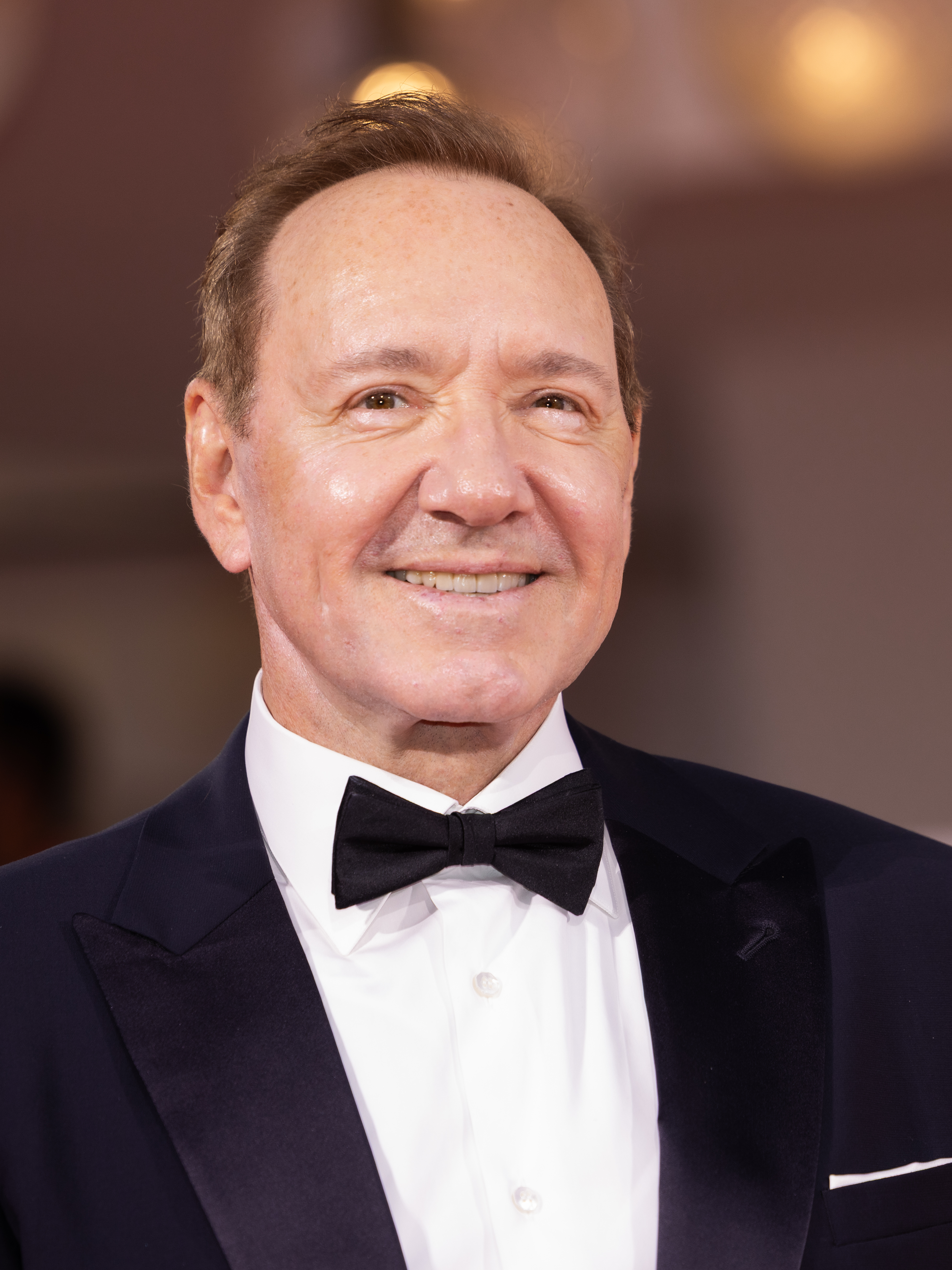
- Spacey in 2025
- Born: Kevin Spacey Fowler; July 26, 1959 (age 67); South Orange, New Jersey, U.S.
- Occupations: Actor; film producer
- Years active: 1981–present
- Works: Full list
- Awards: Full list
- Kevin Spacey's voice Spacey talking about the importance of the film industry, recorded 2011
- Website: kevinspacey.com

Kevin Spacey Fowler (born July 26, 1959) is an American actor. Known for his work on stage and screen, he has received numerous accolades, including two Academy Awards, a BAFTA Award, a Golden Globe Award, a Tony Award, and two Laurence Olivier Awards as well as nominations for twelve Primetime Emmy Awards. He was named an honorary Knight Commander of the Order of the British Empire in 2015.

Spacey began his film career with small roles in Mike Nichols's comedy-drama films Heartburn (1986) and Working Girl (1988). He won two Academy Awards: Best Supporting Actor for playing a con man in The Usual Suspects (1995) and Best Actor for playing a suburban husband and father going through a midlife crisis in American Beauty (1999). His other films include Glengarry Glen Ross (1992), Outbreak (1995), Se7en (1995), A Time to Kill (1996), L.A. Confidential (1997), Pay It Forward (2000), Superman Returns (2006), 21 (2008), Margin Call (2011), Horrible Bosses (2011), and Baby Driver (2017). He has also directed the films Albino Alligator (1996) and Beyond the Sea (2004).

In Broadway theatre, Spacey starred in a revival of Eugene O'Neill's Long Day's Journey into Night in 1986. He won a Tony Award in 1991 for his role in Lost in Yonkers. He won a Laurence Olivier Award for his performance in a revival of The Iceman Cometh in 1999. Spacey portrayed the title role in Richard III in 2011 and Clarence Darrow in a West End production of Darrow in 2015. He was the artistic director of the Old Vic theatre in London from 2004 to 2015, for which he received the Society of London Theatre Special Award. In 2017, he hosted the 71st Tony Awards.

In television, Spacey portrayed Ron Klain in Recount (2008) and produced Bernard and Doris (2008), both for HBO Films. From 2013 to 2017, he starred as Frank Underwood in the Netflix political drama series House of Cards, which won him a Golden Globe Award and two consecutive Screen Actors Guild Awards for Best Actor. Both Spacey and the show itself were nominated for five consecutive Primetime Emmy Awards for Outstanding Lead Actor in a Drama Series and Outstanding Drama Series, respectively.

In 2017, Spacey faced various allegations of sexual misconduct. During 2018 and 2019, he faced multiple criminal investigations. However, in each case Spacey was either not charged or the charges against him were dropped, due to reasons such as death, refusal to testify, or statutes of limitations. He has denied the accusations and was found not liable in a 2022 lawsuit in New York. In a separate case in London, he was acquitted by a jury of sexual assault charges in 2023.

== Early life, family and education ==
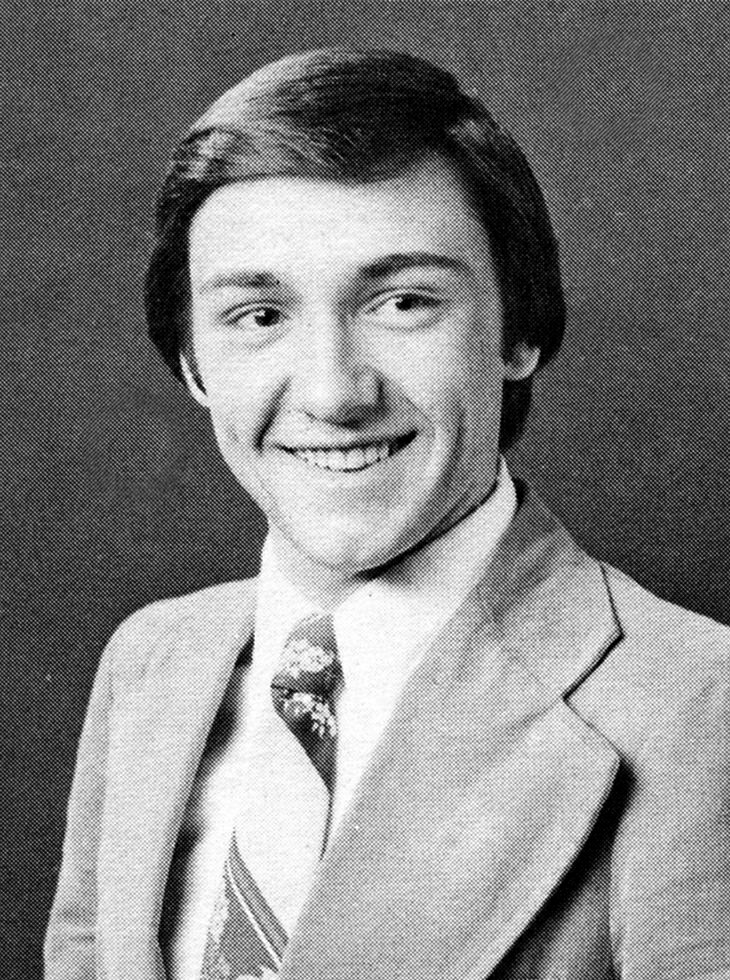
Spacey's 1977 high school yearbook photo

Kevin Spacey Fowler was born in South Orange, New Jersey, to Kathleen Ann (née Knutson), a secretary, and Thomas Geoffrey Fowler, a technical writer and data consultant. His family relocated to Southern California when he was four years old. Spacey has a sister and an older brother, Randy Fowler, from whom Spacey is estranged. His brother has stated that their father, whom he described as a racist "Nazi supporter", was sexually and physically abusive, and that Spacey shut down emotionally and became "very sly and smart" to avoid beatings. Spacey first addressed the matter in October 2022, saying that his father was "a white supremacist and a neo-Nazi" who would call him "an F-word that is very derogatory to the gay community". He stated that, as a result, he became extremely private about his personal life and did not come out as gay earlier in his life. Spacey had previously described his father as "a very normal, middle-class man".

Spacey attended Northridge Military Academy, Canoga Park High School in the 10th and 11th grades. He graduated co-valedictorian (along with Mare Winningham) of the class of 1977 of Chatsworth High School in Chatsworth, Los Angeles, California. At Chatsworth, Spacey starred in the school's senior production of The Sound of Music, playing the part of Captain Georg von Trapp, with Winningham as Maria von Trapp. He started using his middle name "Spacey", which was his paternal grandmother's maiden name. Spacey had tried to succeed as a comedian for several years before attending the Juilliard School in New York City, as a member of Group 12, where he studied drama with teacher Marian Seldes between 1979 and 1981, though he did not graduate. During this time period, he performed comedy in bowling alley talent contests.

== Career ==
=== 1981–1989: Early roles and breakthrough ===
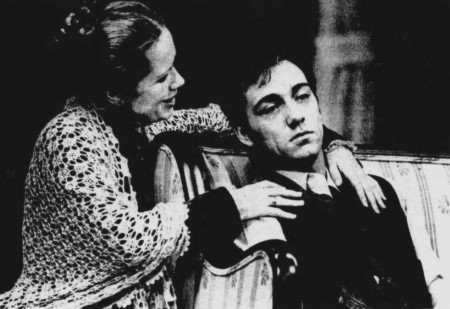
Spacey and Liv Ullmann on the set of Ghosts at the Eisenhower Theater in 1982

Spacey's first professional stage appearance was as a spear carrier in a New York Shakespeare Festival performance of Henry VI, Part 1 in 1981. The following year, he made his first Broadway appearance, as Oswald in a production of Henrik Ibsen's Ghosts, starring Liv Ullmann and director John Neville, which opened at the Eisenhower Theater in Washington's Kennedy Center. He then portrayed Philinte in Molière's The Misanthrope. In 1984, Spacey appeared in a production of David Rabe's Hurlyburly, in which he rotated through each of the male parts (he would later play Mickey in the film version). Next came Anton Chekhov's The Seagull alongside David Strathairn and Colleen Dewhurst. In 1986, Spacey appeared in a production of Sleuth in a New Jersey dinner theatre.

Spacey's prominence as a stage actor began in 1986, when he was cast opposite Jack Lemmon, Peter Gallagher, and Bethel Leslie, as Jamie, the eldest Tyrone son, in Jonathan Miller's lauded production of Eugene O'Neill's Long Day's Journey into Night. Lemmon in particular would become a mentor to Spacey and was invited, along with Spacey's high school drama teacher, to be present when Spacey received his star on the Hollywood Walk of Fame in 1999. In 1986, Spacey made his first film appearance in Mike Nichols's Heartburn starring Meryl Streep and Jack Nicholson. Spacey plays a small role credited as a subway thief. In 1988, Spacey also briefly appeared in another Nichols film, Working Girl, as businessman Bob Speck. Some of Spacey's other early roles include a widowed millionaire on L.A. Law; the television miniseries The Murder of Mary Phagan (1988), opposite Lemmon; and the comedy See No Evil, Hear No Evil (1989). In 1987, Spacey made his first major television appearance in the second-season premiere of Crime Story, playing a Kennedy-esque American senator. That same year he appeared in spy thriller series The Equalizer as Detective Sergeant Cole in the episode "Solo". He earned a fan base after playing the manic depressive arms dealer Mel Profitt on the television series Wiseguy (1988).

=== 1990–1999: Stardom and acclaim ===
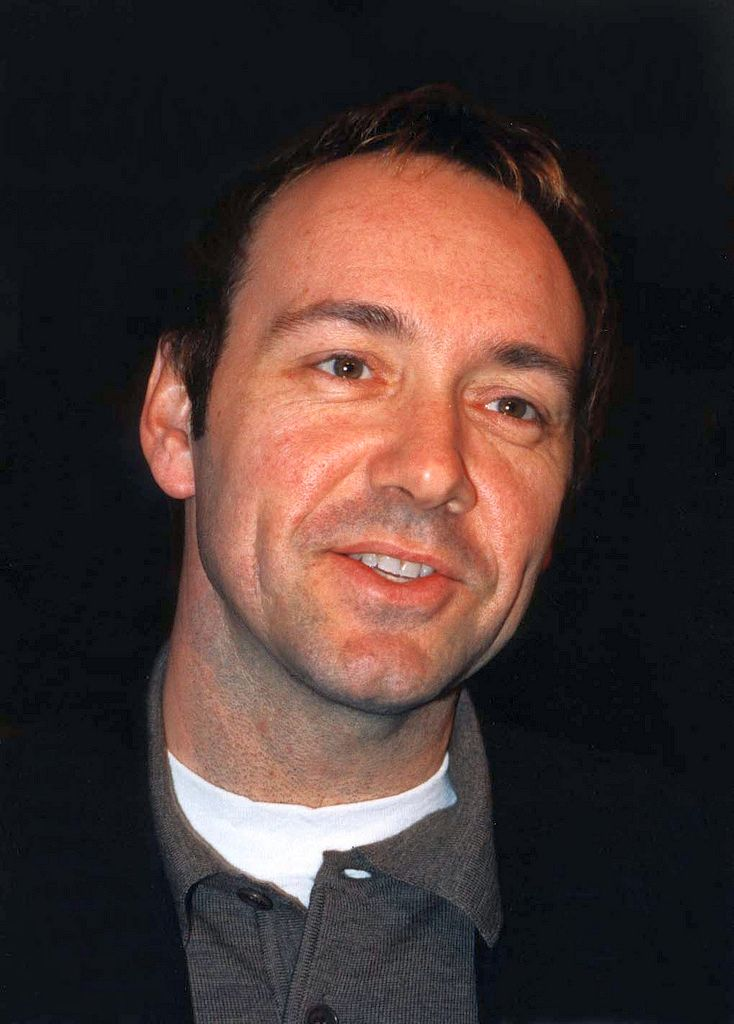
Spacey in 1996

Spacey remained actively involved in the live theatre community. In 1991, he won a Tony Award for his portrayal of Uncle Louie in Neil Simon's Broadway hit Lost in Yonkers. His father was unconvinced that Spacey could make a career for himself as an actor and did not change his mind until Spacey became well known. Spacey quickly developed a reputation as a character actor, and was cast in bigger roles, including the malevolent office manager in the ensemble film adaptation of the David Mamet play Glengarry Glen Ross (1992), as well as news reporter Harry Kingsley in a film based on a 1917 dog sled race Iron Will (1994) directed by Charles Haid. Spacey played one-half of a bickering Connecticut couple alongside Judy Davis in the dark comedy Christmas film The Ref which also starred Denis Leary.(1994), and a malicious Hollywood studio boss in the satire Swimming with Sharks (1995).

Spacey gained prominence for his role as the enigmatic criminal Verbal Kint in Bryan Singer's neo-noir film The Usual Suspects (1995), in an ensemble cast which included Gabriel Byrne, Benicio del Toro, and Chazz Palminteri. Todd McCarthy of Variety wrote, "Spacey is terrific as the mysterious weak link in the chain of thieves". The role won him the Academy Award for Best Supporting Actor. He was also nominated for the Golden Globe Award for Best Supporting Actor – Motion Picture and Screen Actors Guild Award for Outstanding Actor in a Supporting Role. That same year, Spacey also appeared in the David Fincher detective thriller Seven (1995) starring Brad Pitt and Morgan Freeman. Spacey made a sudden entrance late in the film as serial killer John Doe after going uncredited and unmentioned in the film's advertisements and opening credits. His work in Seven, The Usual Suspects and Outbreak earned him Best Supporting Actor honors at the 1995 Society of Texas Film Critics Awards.

Spacey played an egomaniacal district attorney in A Time to Kill (1996) and founded Trigger Street Productions in 1997 with the purpose of producing and developing entertainment across various media. Spacey made his directorial debut with the film Albino Alligator (1996). The film was a box-office bomb, grossing $339,379 with a budget of $6 million, but critics praised Spacey's direction. He starred in the Curtis Hanson-directed neo-noir crime film L.A. Confidential (1997) acting alongside Russell Crowe, Guy Pearce, and Kim Basinger. Spacey played the Detective Sergeant Jack Vincennes, an officer and technical advisor for a fictional TV police drama series. The ensemble cast received praise, with Jack Matthews of Newsday citing Spacey as the highlight writing, "Best of all are Spacey striking an impossible balance of smarminess and charm". The role landed Spacey a nomination for the BAFTA Award for Best Actor in a Leading Role. The following year he voiced the evil grasshopper Hopper in the animated Pixar film A Bug's Life (1998). Throughout his career, Spacey has been well known for playing villains; he remarked in 2013: "I think people just like me evil for some reason. They want me to be a son of a bitch." Spacey hosted Saturday Night Live twice, first in 1997 with musical guest Beck and special guests Michael Palin and John Cleese from Monty Python's Flying Circus.

In 1999, Spacey acted alongside Annette Bening in Sam Mendes' American Beauty. In the film he played the role of Lester Burnham, a depressed suburban father and advertising executive who becomes attracted to his teenage daughter's best friend. Spacey's performance received widespread acclaim, with critic Roger Ebert declaring, "Spacey, an actor who embodies intelligence in his eyes and voice, is the right choice for Lester Burnham. He does reckless and foolish things in this movie, but he doesn't deceive himself; he knows he's running wild--and chooses to, burning up the future years of an empty lifetime for a few flashes of freedom". For this role, Spacey won his second Academy Award. In his acceptance speech, he dedicated his Oscar to Jack Lemmon, praising him as an influence, mentor, and father figure. He also stated, "[Lemmon's] performance in The Apartment stands as one of the finest we've ever had". For his role, he also won the BAFTA Award and Screen Actors Guild Award and received a Golden Globe Award nomination. That same year, he was honored with a star on the Hollywood Walk of Fame. Also in 1999, Spacey won the Laurence Olivier Award for Best Actor and received his second Tony Award nomination in 1999 for The Iceman Cometh.

=== 2000–2009: Established actor and work at the Old Vic ===
Spacey played a physically and emotionally scarred grade school teacher in Pay It Forward (2000), a patient in a mental institution who may or may not be an alien in K-Pax (2001), and singer Bobby Darin in Beyond the Sea (2004). The latter was a lifelong dream project for Spacey, who took on co-writing, directing, co-producing and starring duties in the biography/musical about Darin's life, career and relationship with actress Sandra Dee. Facing little interest for backing in the U.S., Spacey went to the United Kingdom and Germany for funding. Almost all of the film was made in Berlin. Spacey provided his own vocals on the film's soundtrack and appeared in several tribute concerts around the time of its release. Spacey received mostly positive reviews for his singing, as well as a Golden Globe nomination for his performance. However, reviewers debated the age disparity between Spacey and Darin, noting that Spacey was too old to convincingly portray Darin, particularly during the early stages of the singer's life depicted in the film.

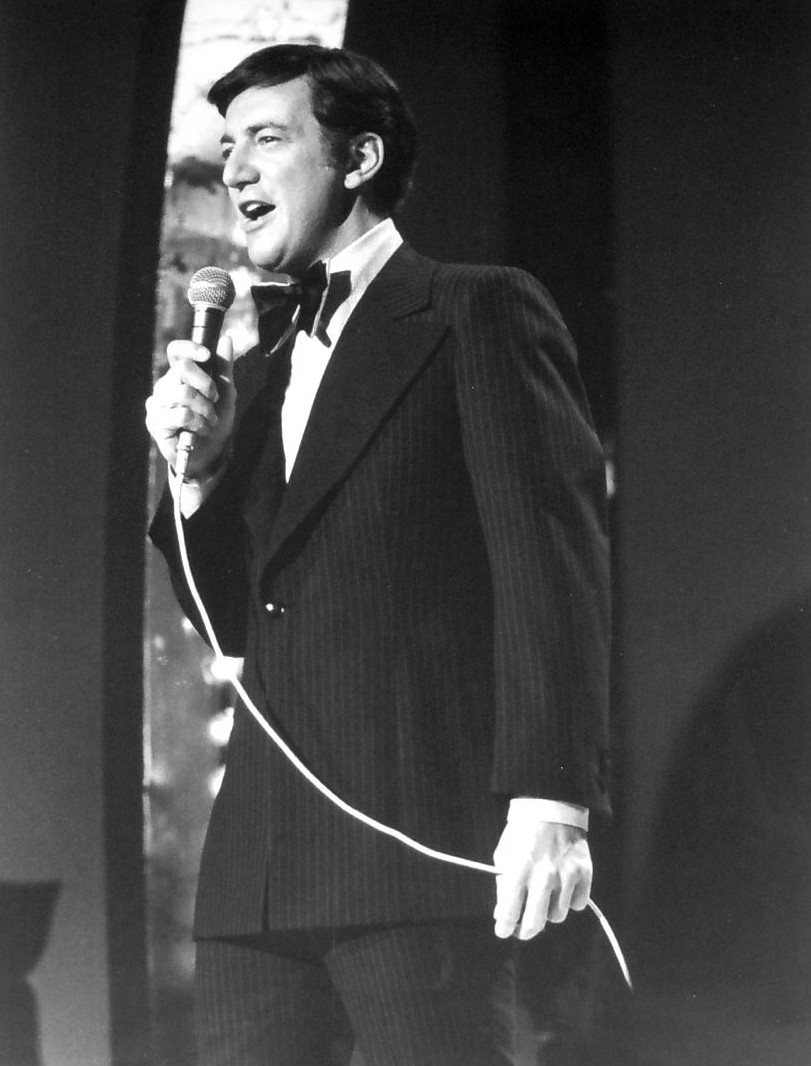
Spacey portrayed singer Bobby Darrin in Beyond the Sea (2004) which he also directed

In February 2003, Spacey announced that he was to become the artistic director of the Old Vic, one of London's oldest theatres. Appearing at a press conference with Judi Dench and Elton John, Spacey promised both to appear on stage and to bring in big-name talent. He undertook to remain in the post for a full ten years. The Old Vic Theatre Company staged shows eight months out of the year. Spacey's first season started in September 2004, opening with the British premiere of the play Cloaca by Maria Goos, directed by Spacey, which opened to mixed reviews. In the 2005 season, Spacey made his UK Shakespearean debut, to good notices, in the title role of Richard II, directed by Trevor Nunn.

In 2006, Spacey played Lex Luthor in the Bryan Singer superhero film Superman Returns starring Brandon Routh. He was to return for its 2009 sequel, but the series was instead rebooted with the 2013 film Man of Steel. Spacey also appeared in Edison, which received a direct-to-video release in 2006. The film was released in theaters in Netherlands on March 12, 2006. In mid-2006, Spacey was working at the Old Vic; at that point in his career, he said, he was "trying to do things now that are much bigger and outside [myself]". Spacey performed in productions of National Anthems by Dennis McIntyre, and The Philadelphia Story by Philip Barry, in which he played C.K. Dexter Haven, the Cary Grant role in the film version. Critics applauded Spacey for taking on the management of a theatre, but noted that while his acting was impressive, his skills and judgment as a producer/manager had yet to develop. In the 2006 season, Spacey suffered a major setback with a production of Arthur Miller's Resurrection Blues, directed by Robert Altman. Despite an all-star cast (including Matthew Modine and future House of Cards co-star Neve Campbell) and the pedigree of Miller's script, Spacey's decision to lure Altman to the stage proved disastrous: after a fraught rehearsal period, the play opened to a critical panning, and closed after only a few weeks. Later in the year, Spacey starred in Eugene O'Neill's A Moon for the Misbegotten, along with Colm Meaney and Eve Best. The play received excellent reviews for Spacey and Best, and was transferred to Broadway in 2007. For the spring part of the 2007–08 season, Jeff Goldblum and Laura Michelle Kelly joined Spacey as the three characters in David Mamet's 1988 play Speed-the-Plow.

Spacey's Capitol/EMI album Forever Cool (2007) features two duets with Spacey and an earlier recording of Dean Martin: "Ain't That a Kick in the Head" and "King of the Road". In December 2007, Spacey co-hosted the Nobel Peace Prize Concert along with Uma Thurman. In 2008 Spacey starred as Ron Klain in the HBO original political drama film Recount revolving around Florida's vote recount during the 2000 United States presidential election between George W. Bush and Al Gore. The film was written by Danny Strong and directed by Jay Roach and starred Bob Balaban, Laura Dern, John Hurt, Denis Leary, and Tom Wilkinson. The television film won three Primetime Emmy Awards, including Outstanding Television Movie. For his performance in the film, Spacey was nominated for the Primetime Emmy Award for Outstanding Lead Actor in a Limited Series or Movie and the Golden Globe Award for Best Actor in a Miniseries or Television Film. That same year Spacey produced the TV movie Bernard and Doris, an HBO semi-fictionalized account of the relationship that developed between socialite heiress and philanthropist Doris Duke and her self-destructive Irish butler Bernard Lafferty later in her life. The film starred Ralph Fiennes and Susan Sarandon and was directed by Bob Balaban. The film premiered at the Hamptons International Film Festival to critical acclaim, and Spacey was nominated for the Primetime Emmy Award for Outstanding Television Movie. Also in 2008, Spacey played a Massachusetts Institute of Technology (MIT) lecturer in the film 21. The film is based on Ben Mezrich's best seller Bringing Down the House: The Inside Story of Six MIT Students Who Took Vegas for Millions, a story of student MIT card-counters who used mathematical probability to aid them in card games such as blackjack. In 2009, he directed the premiere of Joe Sutton's Complicit, with Richard Dreyfuss, David Suchet and Elizabeth McGovern. Later that year, Trevor Nunn directed Spacey in a revival of Inherit the Wind. Spacey played defense lawyer Henry Drummond, a role that was made famous by Spencer Tracy in the 1960 film of the same name. Sam Mendes directed Spacey in Shakespeare's Richard III; Spacey played the title role. The show began in June 2011, commencing a worldwide tour culminating in New York in early 2012. In March 2014, it was announced that Spacey would star in a one-man play at the Old Vic to celebrate his ten years as artistic director. He took on the part of Clarence Darrow in the play.

=== 2010–2017: House of Cards and other roles ===
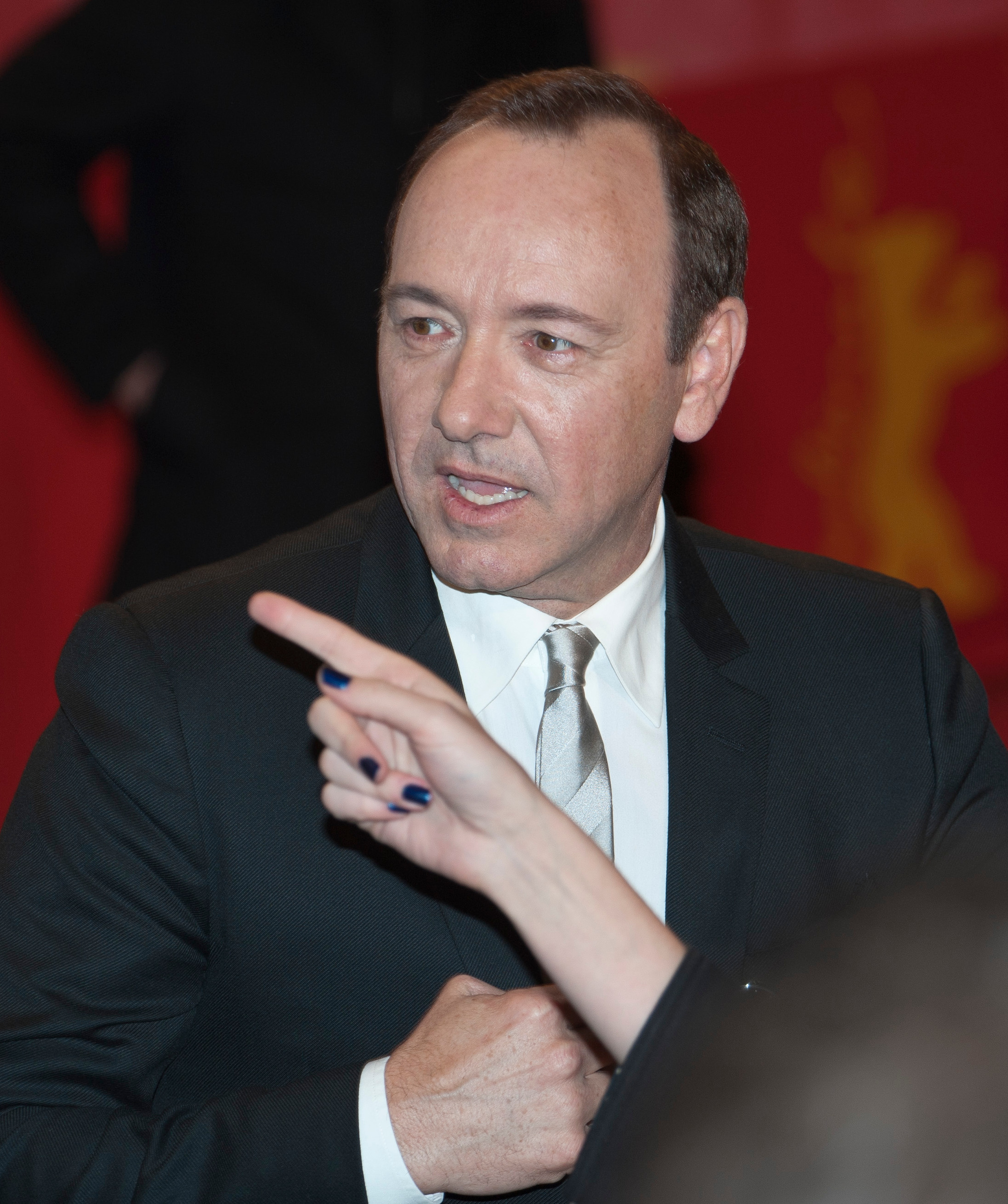
Spacey at the Berlin Film Festival 2011

In early 2010, Spacey went to China to star in writer-director Dayyan Eng's black comedy film Inseparable, becoming the first Hollywood actor to star in a fully Chinese-funded film. In 2011, Spacey starred in J.C. Chandor's financial thriller Margin Call alongside Paul Bettany, Jeremy Irons, Zachary Quinto, Demi Moore, and Stanley Tucci. The story at large takes place over a 24-hour period at a large Wall Street investment bank during the initial stages of the 2008 financial crisis. The film, which focuses on the actions taken by a group of employees during the subsequent financial collapse, made its debut at the Sundance Film Festival to critical acclaim. Spacey received the Independent Spirit Robert Altman Award along with the cast. That same year, Spacey co-starred in the black comedy film Horrible Bosses, which grossed over $209.6 million at the box office.

On March 18, 2011, it was announced that Spacey was cast as Frank Underwood in the Netflix series House of Cards, adapted from a 1990 BBC political drama of the same name. He was nominated for the Primetime Emmy Award for Outstanding Lead Actor in a Drama Series at the 65th Primetime Emmy Awards in 2013, becoming the first lead actor to be Primetime Emmy-nominated from a web television series. Spacey went on to win the Golden Globe award for Best Actor in a Television Series Drama at the 72nd Golden Globe Awards and Screen Actors Guild nomination for Outstanding Performance by a Male Actor in a Drama Series at the 21st Screen Actors Guild Awards for his season 2 performance. He was fired from the series after the fifth season following multiple allegations of sexual misconduct.

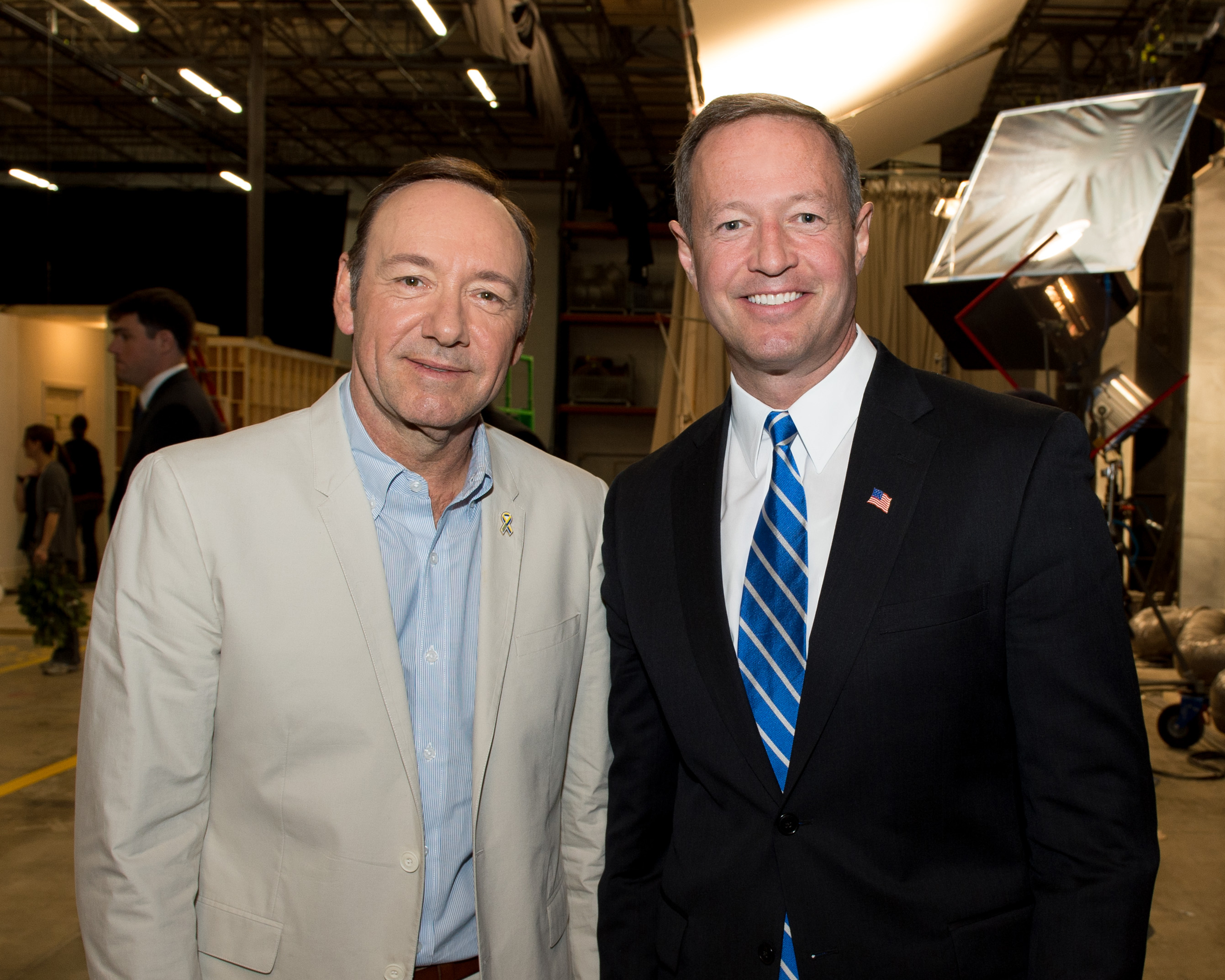
Spacey showing Maryland governor Martin O'Malley around the set of House of Cards, May 2013

In 2013 he executive-produced the biographical survival thriller film Captain Phillips, which was nominated for the Academy Award for Best Picture. Spacey portrayed the antagonist Jonathan Irons in the 2014 video game Call of Duty: Advanced Warfare through motion capture. He starred as President Richard Nixon in the comedy-drama Elvis & Nixon (2016), which is based on the meeting that took place between Nixon and singer Elvis Presley (Michael Shannon) in December 1970 wherein Presley requested that Nixon swear him in as an undercover agent in the Bureau of Narcotics and Dangerous Drugs. He next starred in the comedy film Nine Lives, as a man trapped in the body of a cat. The film was released on August 5, 2016. Spacey is well known in Hollywood for his impressions. When he appeared on Inside the Actors Studio, he imitated (at host James Lipton's request) Jack Lemmon, James Stewart, Johnny Carson, Katharine Hepburn, Clint Eastwood, John Gielgud, Marlon Brando, Christopher Walken, and Al Pacino. On The Tonight Show Starring Jimmy Fallon, Spacey admitted to using his vocal skills as a young actor in New York City to pretend to be Carson's son to obtain free theatre tickets and to enter Studio 54.

In January 2016 it was announced that Relativity Media, which was just emerging from Chapter 11 bankruptcy, had acquired Trigger Street Productions and that Spacey would become chairman of Relativity Studios, while Dana Brunetti would become the studio's president. Spacey called the move "an incredible opportunity to make great entertainment" and said he considered it the "next evolution in my career". However, when the paperwork for the studio was filed for the court, it emerged that Spacey had opted out of assuming the chairmanship of the studios, and by the end of 2016 Brunetti had also left Relativity, while both remained executive producers on House of Cards and Manifesto.

On June 16, 2016, Spacey was awarded an honorary knighthood for his services to theatre, arts education, and international culture in the 2015 Queen's Birthday Honours. The honour, Knight Commander of the Order of the British Empire, was given at Clarence House by then-Prince Charles. As a non-Commonwealth Realm citizen, the award is honorary and he is not entitled to the honorific "Sir". Spacey had previously been awarded the lesser rank of honorary Commander of the Order of the British Empire (CBE) for services to drama in 2010. Spacey was a patron of the Shakespeare Schools Festival, a charity that enables school children across the UK to perform Shakespeare in professional theatres. He also sits on the board of directors of the Motion Picture and Television Fund.

=== 2017–present: Career controversy and comeback attempts ===
In March 2017, it was announced that Spacey would portray J. Paul Getty in Ridley Scott's All the Money in the World. He shot his role in the film in ten days over the summer of 2017. But because of the sexual assault allegations against Spacey, it was announced on November 8, 2017, that all of his footage would be excised, and that Christopher Plummer would replace him in reshoots. Despite the very tight schedule, TriStar Pictures completed the new version of the film in time for a December 25 release. Spacey appeared in the film Billionaire Boys Club, which had a limited release on August 17, 2018. Vertical Entertainment stated that it would take no action to remove Spacey from the film, as it had been completed in late 2016, before the allegations made in October 2017. Following the allegations leveled against him, Spacey maintained a lower profile and his career stalled.

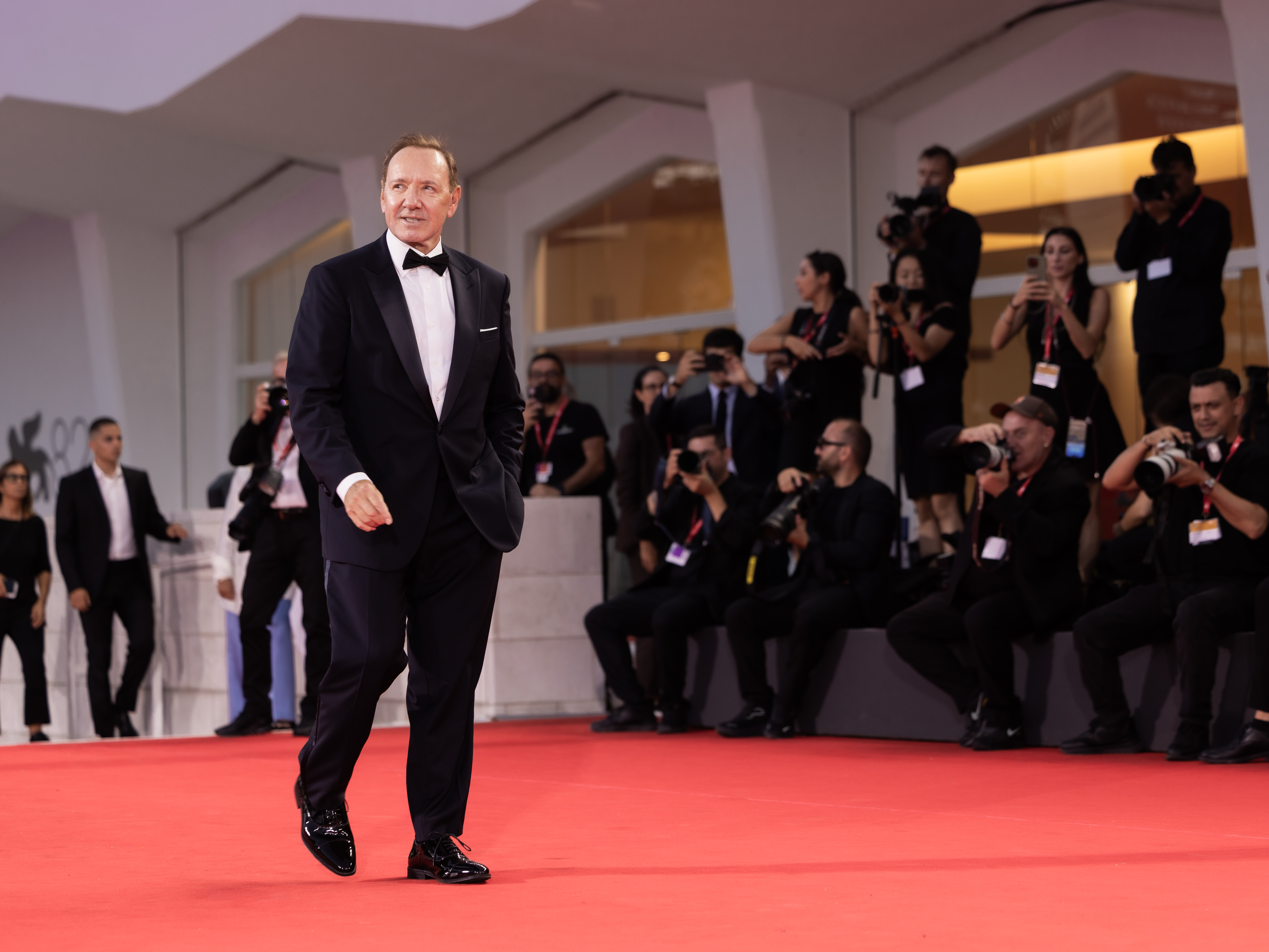
Spacey at the Venice International Film Festival in 2025.

In May 2021, it was announced that he had been cast in a supporting role as a police detective in the crime drama film The Man Who Drew God, directed by and starring Franco Nero, which is about a blind artist who is wrongly accused of sexually abusing a child. The film reunited Spacey with Faye Dunaway, whom he directed in Albino Alligator. In August 2021, Spacey was reportedly filming in California for a small production, Peter Five Eight, in which he plays a "charismatic" serial killer.

On November 3, 2022, Variety reported that Spacey was set to speak at the National Museum of Cinema and was going to receive a lifetime achievement award on January 16, 2023, despite the allegations against him. On November 28, 2022, after winning a sexual battery lawsuit against him filed by Anthony Rapp, Spacey was cast in the British indie thriller Control. Its director, Gene Fallaize, dismissed concerns about working with Spacey. In 2022, Spacey was cast as the late Croatian leader Franjo Tuđman in the political drama Once Upon a Time in Croatia, directed by Jakov Sedlar. In 2024, notable industry members such as actors Sharon Stone, Liam Neeson, F. Murray Abraham, and Stephen Fry, film director Paul Schrader and theatre director Trevor Nunn vocally supported Spacey's attempts to return to acting.

The film Peter Five Eight, released in 2024, marked Spacey's return to a major role after his legal troubles. In the same year, he starred in The Contract, an Italian production, with Eric Roberts.

In November 2025, Spacey performed a cabaret show titled Songs & Stories at the Parklane Resort in Limassol, Cyprus. In an interview with The Daily Telegraph regarding the performance, Spacey stated that he was "living in hotels" and performing where he could find work due to his financial situation following his legal battles. In December 2025, Spacey starred in an Italian comedy television series titled Minimarket on RaiPlay.

== Acting credits and accolades ==
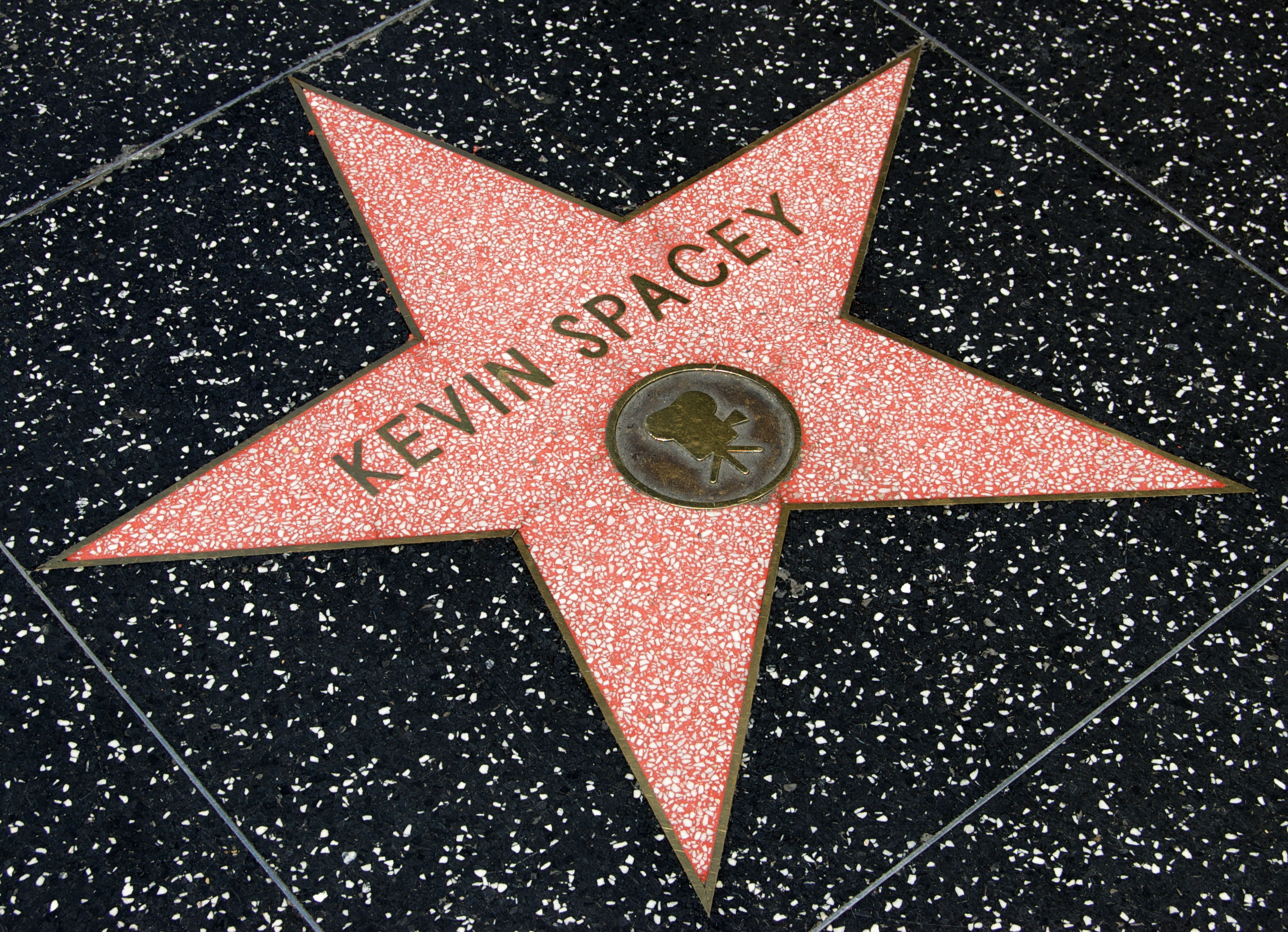
Spacey's star on the Hollywood Walk of Fame, laid in 1999

Spacey has won two Academy Awards, a Tony Award, a Golden Globe Award, four Screen Actors Guild Awards and a British Academy Film Award. He was nominated for a Grammy Award and for 12 Primetime Emmy Awards. Spacey received a star on the Hollywood Walk of Fame in 1999 and was named an honorary Commander and Knight Commander of the Order of the British Empire in 2010 and 2015, respectively.

== Personal life ==
=== Sexuality and relationships ===
Spacey briefly dated American actress April Winchell after she graduated from high school in the early 1980s. An article in The Sunday Times Magazine in 1999 stated that Spacey's "love affair with acting, and the absence of a visible partner in the life of an attractive 40-year-old, has resulted in Esquire magazine asserting two years ago that he must be gay". Spacey responded to the rumors by telling Playboy and other interviewers that he was not gay, and by telling Lesley White of The Sunday Times:

I chose for a long time not to answer these questions because of the manner in which they were asked, and because I was never talking to someone I trusted, so why should I? Recently I chose to participate because it's a little hard on the people I love.

In 1999, reports suggested that Spacey was dating a script supervisor named Dianne Dreyer, with their relationship possibly dating back to 1992. In 2000, Spacey brought Dreyer to the Academy Awards; during the acceptance speech for his Best Actor award, Spacey said, "Dianne, thank you for teaching me about caring about the right things, and I love you." In 2007, Gotham magazine quoted Spacey saying:

I've never believed in pimping my personal life out for publicity. Although I might be interested in doing it, I will never do it. People can gossip all they want; they can speculate all they want. I just happen to believe that there's a separation between the public life and the private life. Everybody has the right to a private life no matter what their professions are.

In 2017, Spacey came out as gay in a statement denying a sexual misconduct allegation.

=== Political views and activism ===
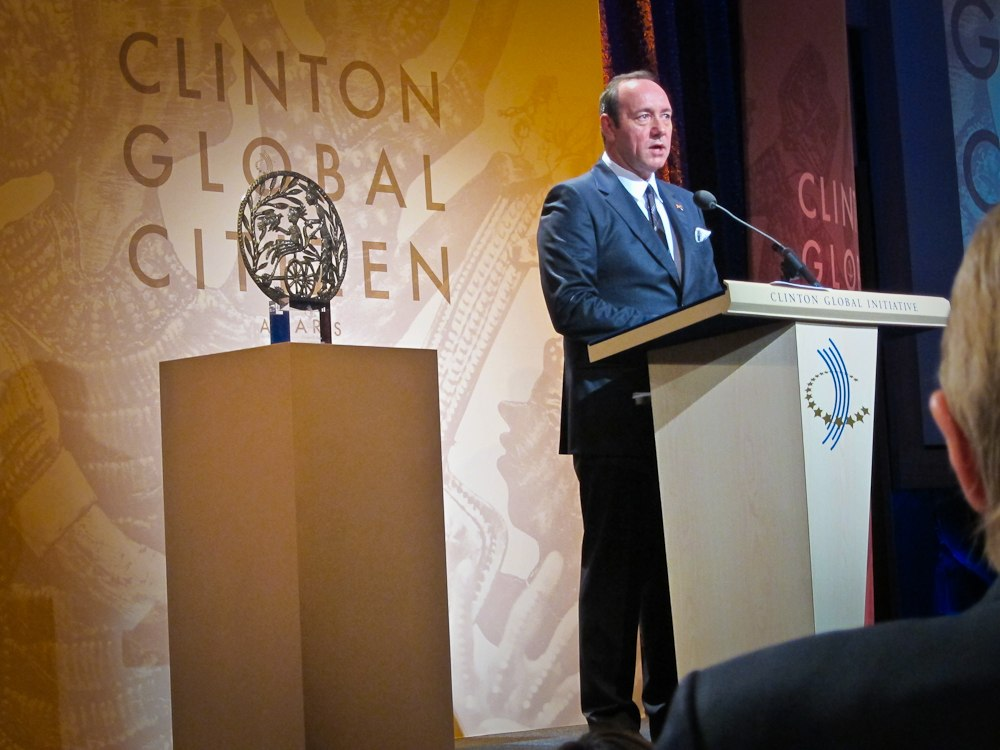
Spacey speaking during the 2010 Clinton Global Citizen Awards

Spacey is a Democrat and has been described as left-leaning. Spacey worked on Jimmy Carter's 1976 presidential campaign. He is a friend of former President Bill Clinton, having met Clinton before his presidency began. Spacey once described Clinton as "one of the shining lights" in the political process. He additionally made a cameo appearance in the short film President Clinton: Final Days, a light-hearted political satire produced by the Clinton Administration for the 2000 White House Correspondents Dinner.

Spacey has undertaken activism in the domain of HIV/AIDS. In 2002, he and fellow actor Chris Tucker accompanied Bill Clinton on a trip throughout several African countries to promote AIDS awareness on the continent. The trip gained renewed attention in 2019 amidst the sex trafficking charges against Jeffrey Epstein, whose plane was used. Epstein's pilot Larry Visoski confirmed that Spacey flew on Epstein's jet. Spacey also participated in several fundraisers for HIV/AIDS healthcare, including amfAR Cinema Against AIDS in 2016 and the 25th Annual Elton John AIDS Foundation Academy Award Party in 2017.

In September 2006, Spacey said that he intended to take up British citizenship when it is offered to him. When asked about the UK's 2016 European Union membership referendum, Spacey replied, "I appreciate you asking me the question, but I am not a British citizen; I am a resident of Great Britain. And I have never in my twelve years ever gotten involved in politics in Great Britain. I think it's inappropriate for me as a, really as a guest, in Great Britain, so I'll leave that to the British people."

Spacey met Venezuelan president Hugo Chávez in September 2007 but never spoke to the press about their encounter. During the trip, he visited the Venezuelan film studio Villa del Cine. In March 2011, following Belarusian president Alexander Lukashenko's crackdown on the Belarusian democracy movement, Spacey joined Jude Law in a street protest in London against Lukashenko's regime.

In October 2008, Spacey started the Kevin Spacey Foundation in the UK to encourage youth involvement in the arts. Headquartered in England and Wales, its purpose was to provide grants to individuals and organizations to help young people study the arts, particularly theatre. The charity shut down in February 2018 following sexual misconduct allegations against Spacey.

In May 2024, Spacey endorsed Robert F. Kennedy Jr., who was running as an independent, in the 2024 United States presidential election. In December 2024, Spacey visited the Israel–Gaza border and toured areas impacted by Hamas' 2023 October 7 attacks. He was accompanied by pro-Israel journalist Douglas Murray. Spacey was reportedly visiting the daughter of a friend, who is serving in the Israel Defence Forces.

In July 2025, Spacey called for the release of the Epstein files, stating, "For those of us with nothing to fear, the truth can't come soon enough." When some of the files were released in December 2025, Spacey was present in some photographs.

== Sexual misconduct allegations ==
In October 2017, Spacey faced various allegations of sexual misconduct. He was immediately fired from his role of Frank Underwood in Netflix’s hit series House of Cards and removed from the film All the Money in the World by director Ridley Scott.

Over the course of the next several years, Spacey faced a variety of civil and criminal cases, none of which resulted in civil liability or a criminal conviction.

In 2019, the state of Massachusetts brought charges for indecent assault and battery against Spacey. The case was later dropped by the prosecutor after the complainant’s mother—former Boston news anchor Heather Unruh—admitted to tampering with evidence by deleting content from her son’s phone.

In 2022, Spacey was found not liable in a civil suit brought by Anthony Rapp in New York, leading a judge to order Rapp to pay Spacey’s legal bills.

In a criminal case in London in 2023, Spacey faced nine sexual assault charges stemming from four separate men. The jury found Spacey not guilty on all counts.

Spacey denied all charges and has never been found guilty of a crime.

== Discography ==
=== Albums ===
- Beyond the Sea: Original Motion Picture Soundtrack (2004)

=== Singles ===
- "That Old Black Magic" (1997, from the Midnight in the Garden of Good and Evil soundtrack)

=== Live performances ===
- "Mind Games" – Come Together: A Night for John Lennon's Words and Music – October 2, 2001, Radio City Music Hall, New York City
- "Bridge over Troubled Water" (with Beverley Knight) – 39th Laurence Olivier Awards – April 12, 2015, Royal Opera House, London
