= Peter Five Eight =

Film by Michael Zaiko Hall

- Theatrical poster
- Directed by: Michael Zaiko Hall
- Written by: Michael Zaiko Hall
- Produced by: Michael Zaiko Hall; Fred Chavez; Jet Jandreau; John Lerchen
- Starring: Kevin Spacey; Rebecca De Mornay; Jet Jandreau; Jake Weber
- Cinematography: Eric Liberacki
- Edited by: Nigel Galt
- Music by: Harvey Davis
- Production companies: Ascent Films; Mad Honey Productions; LTD Films; Forever Safe Productions
- Distributed by: Invincible Entertainment
- Release date: March 22, 2024
- Running time: 102 minutes
- Country: United States
- Language: English

Peter Five Eight is a 2024 American neo-noir thriller film written and directed by Michael Zaiko Hall and starring Kevin Spacey.

== Premise ==
An assassin, Peter, is called to a small mountain community to find a seemingly glamorous real estate agent with a dark secret.

== Cast ==
- Kevin Spacey as Peter
- Jet Jandreau as Sam
- Rebecca De Mornay as Brenda
- Jake Weber as Mr. Lock

== Production ==
Filming occurred in Dunsmuir and Mount Shasta, California in September 2021. As of May 2022, the film was completed.

== Release ==
Peter Five Eight was released in the United States on March 22, 2024.

== Critical reception ==
National Review, “Peter Five Eight is entertaining, if silly.”

Rolling Stone, “A punishingly awkward misfire that splits the difference between a religious allegory and an anti-alcoholism PSA, on Sunday night at the only theater in Los Angeles screening it — and I was the entire audience.”
