= Once Upon a Time in Croatia =

- Croatian: Bilo jednom u Hrvatskoj
- Directed by: Jakov Sedlar
- Starring: Kevin Spacey
- Release date: 2022
- Running time: 90 minutes
- Country: Croatia

Once Upon a Time in Croatia (Croatian: Bilo jednom u Hrvatskoj) is a 2022 docudrama starring Kevin Spacey.

== Overview ==
The documentary tells the story of Franjo Tuđman, Croatia's first president, after the country declared independence from Yugoslavia in the early 1990s.

== Reception ==
The film was divisive among Croatian film critics, although Spacey's performance was generally praised.
