= House of Cards season 2 =

Season of the American television drama series House of Cards

House of Cards
- Season 2
- Blu-ray cover
- Showrunners: David Manson; Beau Willimon
- Starring: Kevin Spacey; Robin Wright; Michael Kelly; Sakina Jaffrey; Michel Gill; Sebastian Arcelus; Mahershala Ali; Nathan Darrow; Rachel Brosnahan; Molly Parker; Gerald McRaney; Jayne Atkinson; Jimmi Simpson
- No. of episodes: 13

Release
- Original network: Netflix
- Original release: February 14, 2014

Season chronology
- ← Previous; Season 1 Next → Season 3

The second season of the American television drama series House of Cards began filming a set of 13 episodes on April 29, 2013, and concluded on November 8. Filming occurred primarily in Baltimore. On December 4, 2013, Netflix announced that the season would be released in its entirety on February 14, 2014. Set in Washington, D.C., season two deals with topics such as entitlement reform, state-sponsored cyberespionage, money laundering in campaign finance, anthrax scares, sexual assault in the United States military, public opinion regarding abortion in the United States, parliamentary procedure of the United States Senate, and Federal government shutdowns. The plot picks back up where season one ends.

Critics previewed the first four episodes of the season under non-disclosure agreements not to reveal any spoilers. Reviews began appearing as early as January 31. Many critics who previewed the season noted the first episode was shocking, but withheld the surprises of the four episodes made available for preview. Willa Paskin of Slate broke the embargo nearly a day early revealing several spoilers. Whereas critics had been somewhat split on the propriety of binge-watching the first season, they were more supportive of the practice for season two.

Early reviews were largely positive, noting that the second season had a darker tone than the first. Molly Parker was praised as an addition to the cast. Nonetheless, many critics were concerned at the domineering presence of Underwood, who appears to have no worthy adversaries. Viewership of the second season was many times higher than season one. The season earned thirteen Primetime Emmy Award nominations for the 66th Primetime Emmy Awards and three nominations at both the 72nd Golden Globe Awards and the 21st Screen Actors Guild Awards. Kevin Spacey won Golden Globe Award for Best Actor – Television Series Drama for playing Frank Underwood in season two. Season two of House of Cards was one of the first shows available in 4K video format on Netflix's streaming service.

== Summary ==
Francis spends most of the season as the newly appointed Vice President of the United States. In early episodes Frank vanquishes reporters on the trail of a murder he committed in the previous season. However, the drama soon shifts to tensions involving Frank, President Walker, the Chinese government, and billionaire businessman Raymond Tusk, eventually culminating in a bitter political war between Frank and Tusk. Frank's wife Claire publicly reveals that she was raped in college by a prominent general and pursues anti-rape legislation. The most significant new character is Jackie Sharp, Frank's successor as House Whip, who soon finds herself embroiled in Frank's plans. As the war between Frank and Tusk consumes the Presidency, things culminate in a scandal that leads to Walker resigning, Tusk being arrested, and Frank ascending to the Oval Office.

== Cast ==
Among the new cast members in season two are Molly Parker and Sam Page, while directors include Carl Franklin, Jodie Foster, James Foley, and Wright. The season features cameos by several notable journalists, including Ashleigh Banfield, Rachel Maddow, Chris Matthews, Matt Bai, Morley Safer, Sean Hannity, and Kelly O'Donnell.

- Kevin Spacey as Francis J. Underwood, the Vice President of the United States
- Robin Wright as Claire Underwood, the Second Lady of the United States
- Michael Kelly as Douglas "Doug" Stamper, the Chief of Staff to the Vice President of the United States
- Molly Parker as Jacqueline "Jackie" Sharp, a war veteran, Congresswoman from California and Underwood's successor as House Majority Whip
- Michel Gill as Garrett Walker, the 45th President of the United States
- Gerald McRaney as Raymond Tusk, a multi-billionaire businessman and investor who acts as an advisor and confidante to President Walker
- Nathan Darrow as Edward Meechum, Secret Service agent on Underwood's detail, a former member of the U.S. Capitol Police serving as Underwood's bodyguard and driver
- Mahershala Ali as Remy Danton, a lobbyist with law firm Glendon Hill and former employee of Frank Underwood
- Derek Cecil as Seth Grayson, a sinister political operative who becomes Press Secretary for Vice President Underwood
- Rachel Brosnahan as Rachel Posner, a former sex worker seeking a new life
- Sakina Jaffrey as Linda Vasquez, the White House Chief of Staff in the Walker Administration
- Jayne Atkinson as Catherine Durant, the U.S. Secretary of State in the Walker Administration
- Jimmi Simpson as Gavin Orsay, a hacker and informant for the FBI
- Joanna Going as Patricia Walker, wife of President Garrett Walker and First Lady of the United States
- Mozhan Marnò as Ayla Sayyad, a tenacious journalist working for the Wall Street Telegraph
- Jeremy Holm as Agent Nathan Green, the White House/FBI liaison
- Sebastian Arcelus as Lucas Goodwin, a senior political editor working at the Washington Herald
- Terry Chen as Xander Feng, a corrupt Chinese businessman and backchannel diplomat who is Raymond Tusk's business partner
- Libby Woodbridge as Megan Hennessey, a former U.S. Marine Private who was sexually assaulted by General Dalton McGinnis
- Kate Lyn Sheil as Lisa Williams, a social worker who befriends Rachel Posner
- Elizabeth Norment as Nancy Kaufberger, secretary of the office of the Democratic House Whip
- Gil Birmingham as Daniel Lanagin, a Native American casino owner in Missouri and friend of Raymond Tusk
- Reg E. Cathey as Freddy Hayes, friend of Frank Underwood and the owner of a BBQ restaurant that Frank frequently visits
- Samuel Page as Connor Ellis, a smooth talking media consultant who becomes Communications Director for Claire Underwood
- Larry Pine as Bob Birch, a Democratic Congressman from Michigan and the Speaker of the U.S. House of Representatives
- Kristen Connolly as Christina Gallagher, a headstrong aide to President Walker and former girlfriend of Peter Russo
- Curtiss Cook as Terry Womack, House Majority Leader from Missouri's 5th congressional district
- Constance Zimmer as Janine Skorsky, a veteran journalist working for news blog Slugline
- Michael Warner as Oliver Spence
- Benito Martinez as Hector Mendoza, a Republican Senator from Arizona and the Senate Majority Leader
- Boris McGiver as Tom Hammerschmidt, former chief editor of the Washington Herald
- David Clennon as Ted Havermeyer, a veteran Congressman from California and PAC Chairman who is a mentor to Congresswoman Sharp
- Elizabeth Marvel as Heather Dunbar, an uncompromising lawyer who is appointed Special Prosecutor in the investigation into money laundering of foreign money via PACs
- Tom Galantich as Reverend Thomas Larkin, a minister and relationship therapist
- Mark Zeisler as Bill Gallich, the White House Counsel
- Reed Birney as Donald Blythe, a Democratic Congressman from New Hampshire
- Sandrine Holt as Gillian Cole
- Ben Daniels as Adam Galloway, a world-renowned photographer and former lover of Claire Underwood
- Kate Mara as Zoe Barnes, an ambitious journalist working for news blog Slugline and former lover of Frank Underwood

== Episodes ==
No. overall	No. in season	Title	Directed by	Written by	Original release date	Prod. code
14	1	"Chapter 14"	Carl Franklin	Beau Willimon	February 14, 2014	HOC-201
Doug Stamper, chief of staff to newly selected Vice President Frank Underwood, warns him about journalists investigating the death of Congressman Peter Russo. When Zoe suggests Russo was murdered, Frank pushes her in front of an oncoming Metro train. Zoe's colleague Janine Skorsky receives nude photos of Zoe that Frank had taken and is frightened into abandoning the investigation; Zoe's lover, editor Lucas Goodwin, refuses to desist. Doug forcibly relocates the sex worker Rachel Posner, who was involved in Russo's covered-up DUI and eventual downfall and is now afraid of the consequences. Frank makes a new ally in Jacqueline Sharp, a former war hero, as his choice to replace him as House Majority Whip, and suggests an open race within the House to allow Jackie to compete against the expected candidates. Claire leverages her former employee Gillian Cole's expected lawsuit by fraudulently excluding vital medication for Gillian's unborn child from her health insurance, and then offers her total control of the Clean Water Initiative as a purported peace offering.
15	2	"Chapter 15"	Carl Franklin	Beau Willimon	February 14, 2014	HOC-202
Frank is sworn in as Vice President and declines to move into the Naval Observatory. The Secret Service renovates his townhouse with required security features. Frank uses Secretary of State Catherine Durant's team to stall a trade meeting with China in order to loosen billionaire Raymond Tusk's influence on President Garrett Walker. Frank convinces Walker to stand tough against China's indignant withdrawal from the meeting, resulting in China cutting off further trade talks with the U.S. Jackie strengthens her race for House Majority Whip, eventually destroying her mentor's career in order to secure the position. At his first formal engagement as Vice President, a military awards ceremony, Claire tells Frank the newly-commissioned General Dalton McGinnis is her college rapist. Lucas looks for a hacker on the Deep web/Dark web to access Frank's phone records and connect him to the deaths of Russo and Zoe.
16	3	"Chapter 16"	James Foley	Bill Cain	February 14, 2014	HOC-203
As Walker crafts his State of the Union address, Tusk reluctantly agrees to postpone resumption of trade talks with China while Frank negotiates a bipartisan agreement with Republican Senate Majority Leader Hector Mendoza on a compromise over reform of public entitlements to avoid a government shutdown. Senate Republicans renege on the agreement, then attempt to avoid a quorum and then filibuster, but Frank thwarts both moves and secures passage of the bill. Doug requests his FBI contact to run a sting operation on Lucas, who is contacted by a hacker Gavin Orsay, claiming to be able to retrieve Zoe's phone records. Rachel contacts her mother and reaches out to a religious stranger, Lisa Williams, despite Doug's instruction to speak to no one.
17	4	"Chapter 17"	James Foley	Laura Eason	February 14, 2014	HOC-204
The Underwoods prepare for their first media interview, and Frank works to secure votes in the House for an amendment to entitlements. Rep. Donald Blythe, who previously was burnt by the late changes in the education bill, opposes the entitlement amendment in principle. Frank and Blythe become quarantined inside the Capitol due to receipt of a package containing suspicious white powder. Interviewed alone, Claire is pressured into revealing she once had an abortion and lies that the pregnancy was a result of her much earlier rape by McGinnis. Her account is supported by a woman, Pvt. Megan Hennessey, who claims McGinnis assaulted her in the Marines. Jackie and Remy Danton lobby for votes to avoid the government shutdown, both revealing negotiating skills unexpected by the other. Gavin is revealed to be facing federal charges for his association with a hacktivist group, and is reluctantly informing for the FBI as part of a plea bargain. Frank and Claire once again enjoy a smoke at their window, and Frank sings the murder ballad "Pretty Polly" for her.
18	5	"Chapter 18"	John Coles	Kenneth Lin	February 14, 2014	HOC-205
While attending a Civil War reenactment, Frank holds back-channel negotiations with Xander Feng, a Chinese billionaire and business partner of Tusk's, over construction of a bridge over the Long Island Sound. Frank discovers Feng and Tusk are manipulating a trade summit in Washington, using a U.S. lawsuit against China at the WTO to benefit their investments and strengthen their influence with the Chinese government. Frank acts to drop the lawsuit against Feng's request and falsely accuses Feng of double-dealing, driving a wedge between Tusk and Walker. Feng refuses to build the bridge, and Walker withdraws the U.S. delegation from the trade summit, risking an international trade war. Claire enlists support from First Lady Tricia Walker to advocate with military officials for more protection against sexual assault in the armed forces. An alleged media consultant, Seth Grayson, learns that Claire's abortion is not related to her rape and leverages it to replace Connor Ellis as the Underwoods' press secretary. Lucas visits an AT&T data center allegedly to write an article on cybersecurity, and surreptitiously inserts a USB drive into a data server to provide access to Gavin. His tour guides reveal themselves to be undercover FBI agents and arrest him.
19	6	"Chapter 19"	John Coles	John Mankiewicz	February 14, 2014	HOC-206
The White House works to prevent a national energy crisis due to the stalled trade negotiations with China. Frank proposes establishing a federal subsidy for raw materials for nuclear power. Claire hints to Tricia that Christina Gallagher, a former chief of staff to Peter Russo who is now a presidential aide, could be pursuing an intimate relationship with Walker. In custody, Lucas refuses to plead guilty and requests his former boss Tom Hammerschmidt to continue the investigation. The FBI intimidate Janine into convincing Lucas to accept a plea deal. Doug attempts to pressure Rachel into cutting ties with Lisa and discontinuing her regular church attendance. Jackie and Remy discuss the proposed energy legislation and end up having sex. Tusk intimates his intent to fight the bill, and Frank encourages Walker to raise the stakes using the FERC. Frank is about to throw the ceremonial first pitch at Camden Yards when the stadium lights go out as Tusk's utility company shuts off power to the grid. Tusk threatens another power outage in the south-east states. Frank advises Walker to have the federal government take over Tusk's power plants. Frank later privately tells Tusk that their interests are no longer aligned.
20	7	"Chapter 20"	James Foley	Bill Kennedy	February 14, 2014	HOC-207
Tusk pressures the Walker Administration by funding Republican attack ads for the forthcoming midterm elections. Frank learns that the donations are disguised through a Kansas City casino and sends Doug to investigate. Doug learns that Feng is donating the money and flies to Beijing to negotiate. Frank learns that Tusk is working with Feng, which puts Frank himself in a tricky position, since he should have known about it when he was the Whip. Frank unsuccessfully asks casino owner Daniel Lanagin to stop the attacks. Feng requests approval to build the bridge as a consolation for losing his refinery deal with Tusk. Seth is revealed to be a double agent working for Remy; however, he divulges this to Frank and expresses his desire to work for Frank's power over Tusk's money. Wall Street Telegraph reporter Ayla Sayyad links Tusk and Feng to the refinery deal and decides to investigate their business for illicit activity. Frank tells Jackie to whip support for Claire's sexual assault bill but she quietly stalls it. The Underwoods host President Walker and his wife for dinner, where the First Couple admit to their marital problems. Freddy is approached to franchise out his restaurant brand.
21	8	"Chapter 21"	James Foley	David Manson	February 14, 2014	HOC-208
Frank lobbies Walker and Linda Vasquez to approve the bridge contract, but they are focused on the midterms. He meets with Lanagin and Tusk, who offers to discontinue Republican funding in exchange for reconciliation with Walker. Frank clashes with Linda over the bridge proposal, resulting in her resignation. Doug informs Feng that the bridge is approved and instructs him to abandon the refinery project with Tusk. Megan has a panic attack and is unable to testify against McGinnis. Claire suggests that Tricia convince her husband to attend marriage counseling, and Walker reluctantly agrees. Lisa moves in with Rachel and they become lovers. Jackie and Remy's relationship progresses. Remy tracks down Claire's former lover Adam Galloway, while Tusk authorizes publication of an intimate photograph of Claire.
22	9	"Chapter 22"	Jodie Foster	Beau Willimon	February 14, 2014	HOC-209
Claire requests Adam to publicly deny their affair and he complies, but then Claire and Frank lie to the media that they had commissioned Galloway to take the leaked photo as an anniversary gift for Frank. Remy pressures Adam to release a second intimate photo of Claire, blackmailing him with a threat to his fiancée Inez's father in Bogotá. Claire intimidates Adam into claiming that the whole episode is a publicity stunt to stimulate his languishing photography business. Doug cautions Seth about his ambitions in Frank's team. Ayla interviews Tusk, who orders her to stop investigating him and Feng with veiled threats. Tusk assumes Frank is driving Ayla's investigation and orders Remy to publicize Freddy's criminal past. Freddy loses the franchise deal and is forced to sell his restaurant to pay his son's bail. Freddy accepts Frank's apology, but refuses to accept financial assistance. Frank feels the loss of one of his few friends, and is motivated to destroy Tusk.
23	10	"Chapter 23"	Robin Wright	Laura Eason and Beau Willimon	February 14, 2014	HOC-210
Walker responds to a Chinese blockade of a Japanese island. At the Underwood residence, Secret Service agents apprehend a bomber who confesses that Claire's confession influenced his wife to abort their child, without informing him beforehand. Seth leaks information to Ayla linking Tusk to Lanagin's casino, confirming her suspicions that Tusk is using laundered money to influence Congress. Ayla publishes the story, causing a huge stir in national media. Walker consults the White House Counsel but eventually appoints a special prosecutor to clear his administration of involvement. Based on her military service, Jackie attempts to alter the proposed sexual assault bill but Claire refuses to negotiate. Seth learns of Remy's relationship with Jackie, leading Frank to believe that Jackie's opposition to the bill is another attack from Tusk. Frank berates Jackie and suggests that Remy is playing her. He chooses Seth's strategy despite Doug's protest, and believes Doug's rivalry with Seth is affecting his work. Doug permits Rachel to allow Lisa to stay with her. The Underwoods appreciate the loyalty of their bodyguard, Edward Meechum, and share an informal drink with him. The code Lucas inserted into AT&T's data server enables Gavin to track Doug's movements.
24	11	"Chapter 24"	John Coles	John Mankiewicz and Beau Willimon	February 14, 2014	HOC-211
Frank stonewalls Heather Dunbar, the special prosecutor leading the corruption investigation, but when she reveals a photo of Doug at Lanagin's casino along with proof of his trip to China, Frank is forced to confirm his back-channeling effort with Feng. Frank appears to cooperate by submitting his and Walker's official travel logs. Lanagin accuses Remy of making him a patsy to save Tusk. Remy tries to pressure Jackie to falsely implicate Frank in the scandal, but she refuses to be manipulated. Unsure of which side will win, Remy offers Frank reduced attacks in return for Frank's influence should Tusk lose. Tricia withdraws her support for the sexual assault bill, so Claire encourages Megan to go public with her story. Frank returns home to a drunk Claire and Meechum, and joins them in a threesome. Doug mends his relationship with Seth and struggles with his obsession with Rachel after seeing her and Lisa having sex. Dunbar finds Walker's marriage counseling sessions in his travel logs.
25	12	"Chapter 25"	James Foley	Beau Willimon	February 14, 2014	HOC-212
Walker accuses Frank of engineering his downfall and breaks off all contact with him. Frank convinces Durant and Dunbar to obtain Feng's testimony by offering him diplomatic immunity and political asylum. This forces Walker to waive doctor–patient confidentiality. Dunbar discovers Walker's therapist was coached by the White House to withhold that he prescribed medication to Walker, which further weakens the president's position. Seth reveals to Tusk that Remy offered to rejoin Frank's team. Tusk is subpoenaed but invokes the Fifth Amendment, confident he will get a presidential pardon. Megan publicly derides Jackie for opposing the sexual assault bill. Jackie in turn derides Claire, who then withdraws the bill, destroying Megan's composure. Doug forces Rachel to break up with Lisa and evict her. Gavin blackmails the FBI for his freedom and other conditions. The Underwoods convince Jackie to guide Walker's impeachment for the best interest of the Democratic Party.
26	13	"Chapter 26"	James Foley	Beau Willimon	February 14, 2014	HOC-213
Walker asks Tusk to implicate Frank in the money laundering scheme in return for a pardon. Frank makes the same request in return for an assurance to restore trade relations with China. Gavin informs Doug that he knows about Rachel, and pressures him for protection. Doug relocates Rachel, who, terrified, flees from his car and beats him unconscious in the woods. Frank later sends Walker a signed admission of sole responsibility for the scandal. Walker requests Frank to produce results by whipping votes to stave off his impeachment, but Frank drives the opposite vote. Walker revokes his offer to pardon Tusk, who then implicates him in the scandal and is arrested. Walker's approval rating drops to 8% and the House votes to pursue his impeachment, forcing him to resign. He parts with Frank on good terms, unconvinced of his treachery. Frank is sworn in as the 46th President of the United States. He restores trade relations with China by rescinding Feng's asylum and allowing his extradition to his home country. Claire gives Frank a copy of his class ring, which he buried at the Civil War memorial.

== Background ==
The second season was made available in its entirety on February 14, 2014 (Valentine's Day) at 12:01 a.m. PT. Prior to the release of season 1, three reviewers, Hank Stuever of The Washington Post, Nancy deWolf Smith of The Wall Street Journal, and Alessandra Stanley of The New York Times, commented on possible binge viewing by Netflix customers. Stanley notes that the show "is probably seen best one episode at a time. It's a delicious immorality play with an excellent cast, but the tempo is slow and oddly ponderous—a romp slowed down to a dirge". Smith also notes that due to its "relentless theme", "House of Cards might go down better in smaller portions and thus be enjoyably prolonged", deriding potential binge watchers as people who liken a delicacy to a "bag of M&M's". However, Stuever disagreed about season 1 saying "So, on the iffy chance that House of Cards draws you in and you simply cannot stop watching, then, yes, you may power-binge your way through all 13 hours at once". Upon viewing the four episode season 2 preview Time's James Poniewozik says "I could easily see powering through the season in a free weekend, precisely because no individual episode needs much time to sink in". Stanley also felt the second season was "binge-worthy" upon viewing the preview. However, Ellen Gray of Philly.com supports not binge-watching the season, as she believes it does not serve it well.

== Production ==
=== Writing ===
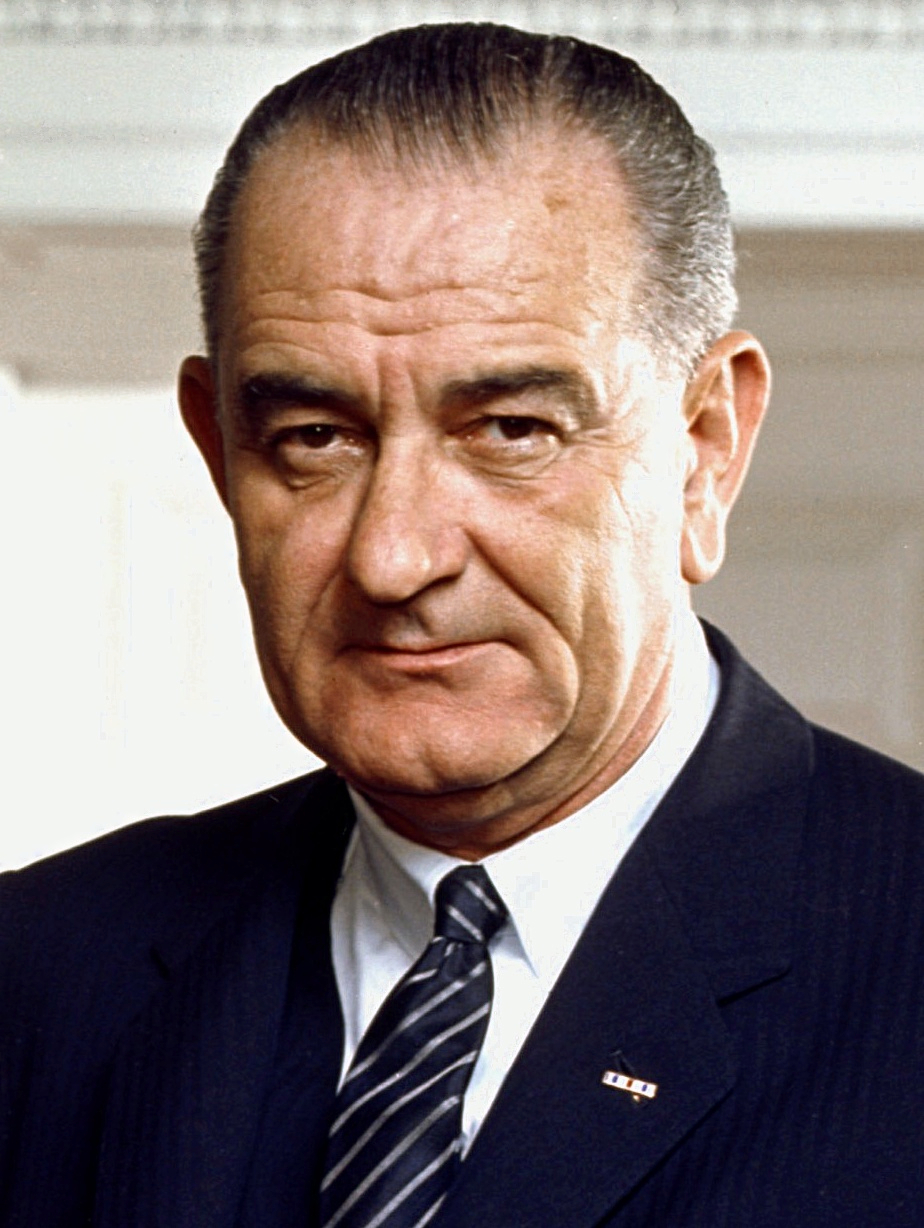
Showrunner Beau Willimon drew inspiration from Robert Caro's acclaimed series of biographies about Lyndon Johnson (pictured).

In interviews during the writing and filming of season 2 showrunner Beau Willimon said he had drawn inspiration for the series from a variety of sources including Robert Caro's The Years of Lyndon Johnson and Jeremy Larner's Nobody Knows. Lyndon B. Johnson was a repeated source for themes and issues. Willimon also commented on the fictional world of politics that the show represented: "It's a rough-and-tumble game whenever power is involved—people's ambitions, their desires, their competitive spirit will often push them to play outside the rules." Willimon noted that "I don't think about topping things ... The evolution of character is not a game of one-upmanship. It is about change. Souls are vast and so the opportunity to explore ways in which characters contradict themselves and evolve is also vast" and that season 2 provided the opportunity "to expand the world and more deeply explore the characters".

For Spacey, the portrayal of Underwood for a second season was a learning process. "There is so much I don't know about Francis, so much that I'm learning ... I've always thought that the profession closest to that of an actor is being a detective ... We are given clues by writers, sometimes clues they're aware of and sometimes not. Then you lay them all out and try to make them come alive as a character who's complex and surprising, maybe even to yourself". Gerald McRaney spoke about his expanded role by saying that whereas in season 1 the challenge to playing his character, Raymond Tusk, was in "having to learn Mandarin", in season 2 his character has become "somebody who you don't know which color hat he's wearing".

=== Filming ===
Netflix had ordered two seasons of 13 episodes when it made its original commitment to the series in 2011. According to Governor of Maryland Martin O'Malley, production of the first season brought $140 million in the form of 2,200 jobs and transactions with 1,800 vendors to the Baltimore metropolitan area economy and the Maryland General Assembly expanded its Film Production Tax Credit so that season two could have similar impact over the course of 150 days of filming. Like the first season, the second season was largely filmed in the Baltimore area. Although production was publicized as being in Baltimore, Season 1 had based production in Harford County, Maryland, and season 2 also had its production office in Edgewood and a Joppa sound stage. The April 27, 2013 White House Correspondents Dinner spoofed House of Cards from the Maryland set prior to the beginning of the filming of season 2. Filming began on Monday, April 29, 2013, which was just a few weeks later in the year than season 1 had started. On May 14, O'Malley visited the set to publicize the success of the tax incentives.

During spring and summer 2013, the show hosted several large casting calls some of which had over 1000 hopefuls. On June 13, crews began preparing the State House for filming on June 17 and 18. The Maryland State House is not available for rent so the producers made donations to various organizations. The show filmed in Annapolis at the Maryland House of Delegates and the wife of House Speaker Michael E. Busch, Cynthia, was cast as an extra. She played a United States senator as the set depicted the United States Senate chamber. The scenes were used as part of "Chapter 16" (season 2, episode 3). On July 24, the show announced that it would film at the Baltimore County Circuit Courthouses in Towson, Maryland on July 31. The filming occurred at this location on August 7.

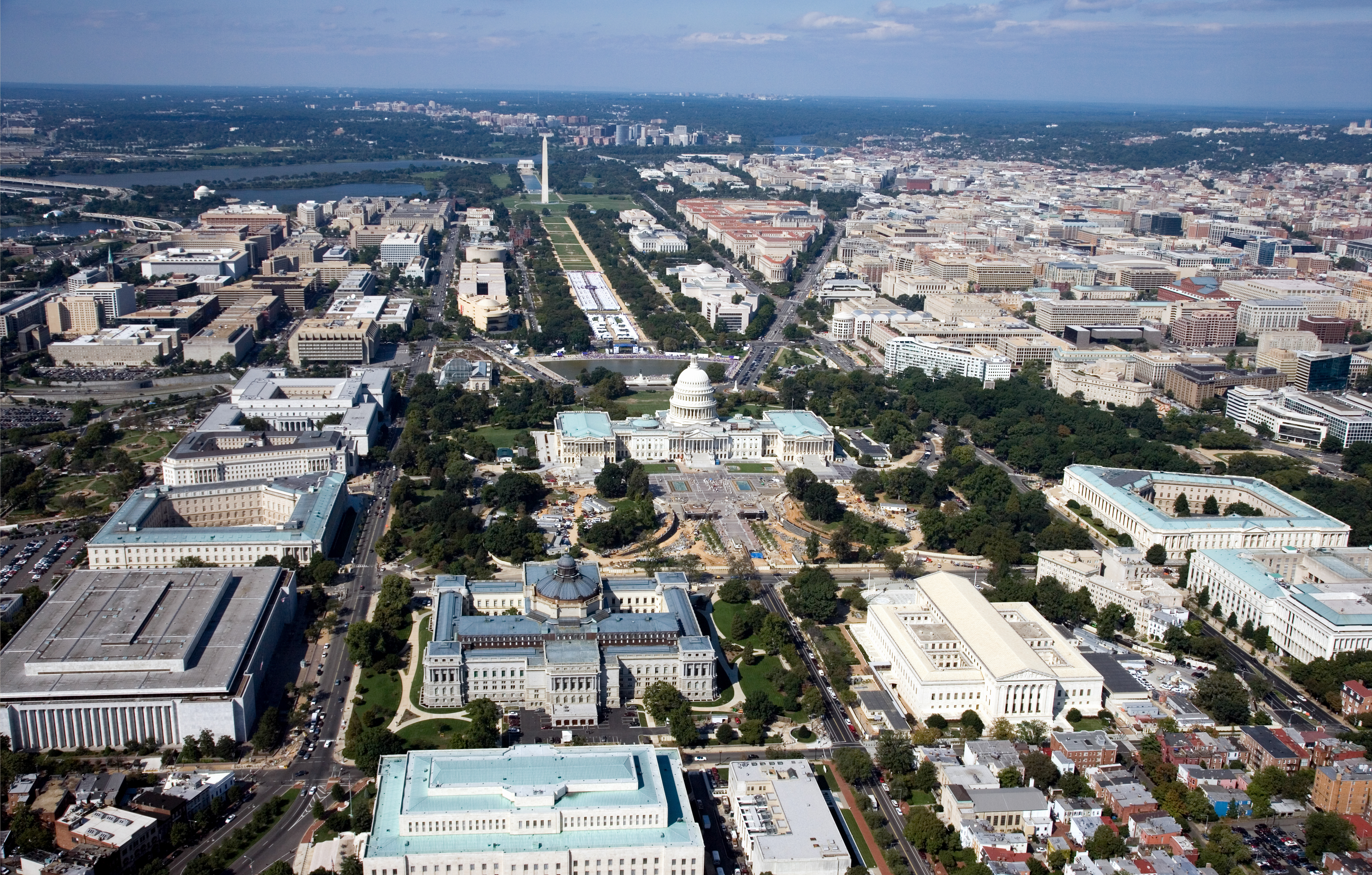
There was controversy regarding filming at the National Mall in Washington, D.C.

On August 3, House of Cards was going to film a presidential motorcade at the National Mall in Washington, D.C. at 3 PM. However, Chief of police Cathy L. Lanier of the Metropolitan Police Department of the District of Columbia (MPD) revoked the permits that morning. An MPD spokesperson explained "The Metropolitan Police Department is not the lead agency on presidential motorcades and we did not want to portray ourselves as such". As a result, the production crews did a last minute filming of the desired scenes back in Baltimore. The next day, Mayor of the District of Columbia Vincent Gray stated that there was confusion on what role the MPD would play in the filming. A spokesperson from his office stated that ""MPD is not going to rent itself out as extras for film ... That's what MPD's decision was focused on. We're not going to be actors." On October 2, all issues were resolved and the motorcade was filmed as originally planned without any MPD personnel "actively participate in the filming".

In August, several areas in Harford County were used for filming season 2, including areas in Bel Air and Edgewood. Havre de Grace had been used in season 1 to depict Underwood's home district in South Carolina. The Liriodendron mansion was the scene of filming on August 12 and 13. Bel Air police were paid $1550 for August 13 duties at another filming location.

Although there were reports that the filming was largely completed by October 1, Willimon tweeted on that date that he had just finished writing the season finale. Willimon and others tweeted that filming was completed on November 8. The following week, House of Cards workers got involved in the Typhoon Haiyan relief efforts.

According to an October 10 story in The Huffington Post, executive producer Rick Cleveland stated that he believed that season 2 would be the final season because both Spacey and Wright prefer to act in movies than in television. However, Willimon remained optimistic that the show will continue. The Baltimore Sun reporter, David Zurawik contested the journalistic process of The Huffington Post report because he says Modi Wiczyk, CEO of Media Rights Capital, the company that produces House of Cards, told him "I would basically be shocked if there wasn't [a season 3, 4 and 5]". A few weeks later, Netflix's Chief Content Officer Ted Sarandos confirmed that Netflix had an earnest interest in continuing House of Cards beyond its second season.

=== Post-production ===
On December 4, 2013, Netflix announced that the 13-episode season would be released in its entirety on February 14, 2014. Along with the scheduling announcement, Netflix confirmed that Francis (now Vice President) and Claire would "continue their ruthless rise to power as threats mount on all fronts". After season 1 received four nominations for the 71st Golden Globe Awards on December 12, a season 2 trailer was released on December 13. However, the first official full trailer was released on January 6.

Willimon has stated "In conception of the second season, I put a lot of thought into the doors open to us in seasons three and beyond ... I didn't want to paint ourselves into a corner in the second season." On February 4, 2014, Netflix announced it had renewed the web series for a season 3 of undisclosed length. In May 2014, the season became one of the first Netflix streaming offerings available in 4K video format.

== Reception ==
=== Critical reception ===
The season was generally well received. The review aggregator Metacritic gave the season a score of 80 out of 100, based on 25 critics. Another review aggregator, Rotten Tomatoes gave the season a rating of 83%, based on 48 reviews, with an average rating of 7.9/10. The site's critical consensus reads, "House of Cards proves just as bingeworthy in its second season, with more of the strong performances, writing, and visual design that made the first season so addictive."

James Poniewozik of Time says "It is the same show you saw last season, the same weaknesses and strengths intact, but, as it makes clear before the first hour is over, every bit as brutal and sanguinary." According to Sara Smith of The Kansas City Star, "The shock and delight of the showy storytelling ... has faded a bit". Smith says that Barnes, Skorsky, and Goodwin's "investigation sucks them down a rabbit hole into a surreal underworld no sane reporter would explore". Regarding Frank, Smith says "A show can successfully revolve around one man, but a flawless winning streak gets monotonous" and that "it's time for someone to take Frank down a notch".

Willmore says that since characters have been introduced, "season two of House of Cards begins in a fashion that's far more free and quick-paced" than season 1. Willmore also notes that, "If season one slowly grew blacker in tone as it went from serious games of power and manipulation to life-and-death ones, season two starts off there and looks to only get darker in content." However, she stated that season 2 appeared to be lighter than season 1: "delivered with more of a wink by Frank than before. It may be darker, but it's also less heavy".

Stanley praises the series saying "It's not clear exactly why this bleak series is so exhilarating and binge-worthy. It could be that just as victims of tragedy find it hard to accept that their suffering is random and purposeless, voters find it intolerable that so many of the petty, shortsighted moves by elected officials have no greater meaning than small-time expediency." She also notes that the series "is more cynical than The Americans on FX and more pessimistic about human nature than The Walking Dead on AMC". However, The Americans "is more complex and inventive" according to Stanley who concurs that season 2 is darker but notes it is more compelling than season 1. Stuever compares the show unfavorably to both Veep for its "bumbling chaos and ego implosions" over House of Cards "prohibitively sinister" execution and The Good Wife for its superior delivery of "nastiness and self-interest in power plays".

Many critics criticized the lack of reasonable challenge for the Underwoods. James Poniewozik notes that "Francis needs a stronger nemesis, if not for the sake of justice then for the sake of excitement. And House of Cards would be a greater show if it had characters who were people more than game pieces. Still, on its limited terms, it's absorbing to watch". According to Entertainment Weekly's Karen Valby, the show's fundamental problem is that "The Underwoods have no worthy opponents." According to Variety's Brian Lowry, as conniving as Underwood is, it is unfathomable that "nobody else in a town built on power seems particularly adept at recognizing this or combating him". Valby notes that neither Tusk nor Goodwin is an effective foe, leaving the audience longing for a comeuppance in the first four episodes that served as a preview for critics and his hopeful that Sharp provides a good foil as the season progresses. He also wrote that House of Cards overplays its depiction of the edginess of "Washington being venal and corrupt". He describes the show as a "mixed bag".

Tim Goodman of The Hollywood Reporter describes the preview of the season by saying "It's entertaining and cruises along with a strong pulse. There's a core mystery and American politics is mocked, appropriately, for being a two-party hustle of recrimination and separatism." Goodman notes that writer Beau Willimon has Frank "pontificate to the point of spouting cliches from time to time" and Frank's "conniving wins too often". Goodman sums things up by saying "There's a heavier hand than is necessary at times" and "House of Cards needs to stay more focused to be successful."

Chuck Barney of the San Jose Mercury News had a more mixed response, noting that the preview episodes show that the series is as "handsomely crafted and marvelously acted as ever" but the episodes don't "provoke the same kind of adrenaline rush as last season". Barney was also impressed with newcomer Parker: "She's an agile actress who can deliver a sense of soft-spoken warmth but also a steely fierceness that comes with an underlying message: 'Underestimate me at your own peril.'"

The addition of Parker was well received among critics. Stanley notes that as Underwood's "protégée and, like everyone else in his poisoned orbit, soon discovers that Underwood expects his people to cast aside principle and pursue his grand plan." Valby describes her performance as one "played with throbbing edge". Goodman notes she serves to somewhat counterbalance Frank.

Verne Gay of Newsday notes that "Spacey's Underwood is even more sinuous, more complex, more treacherous and so—as a result—is the deeply pleasurable show that surrounds him."

=== Awards ===
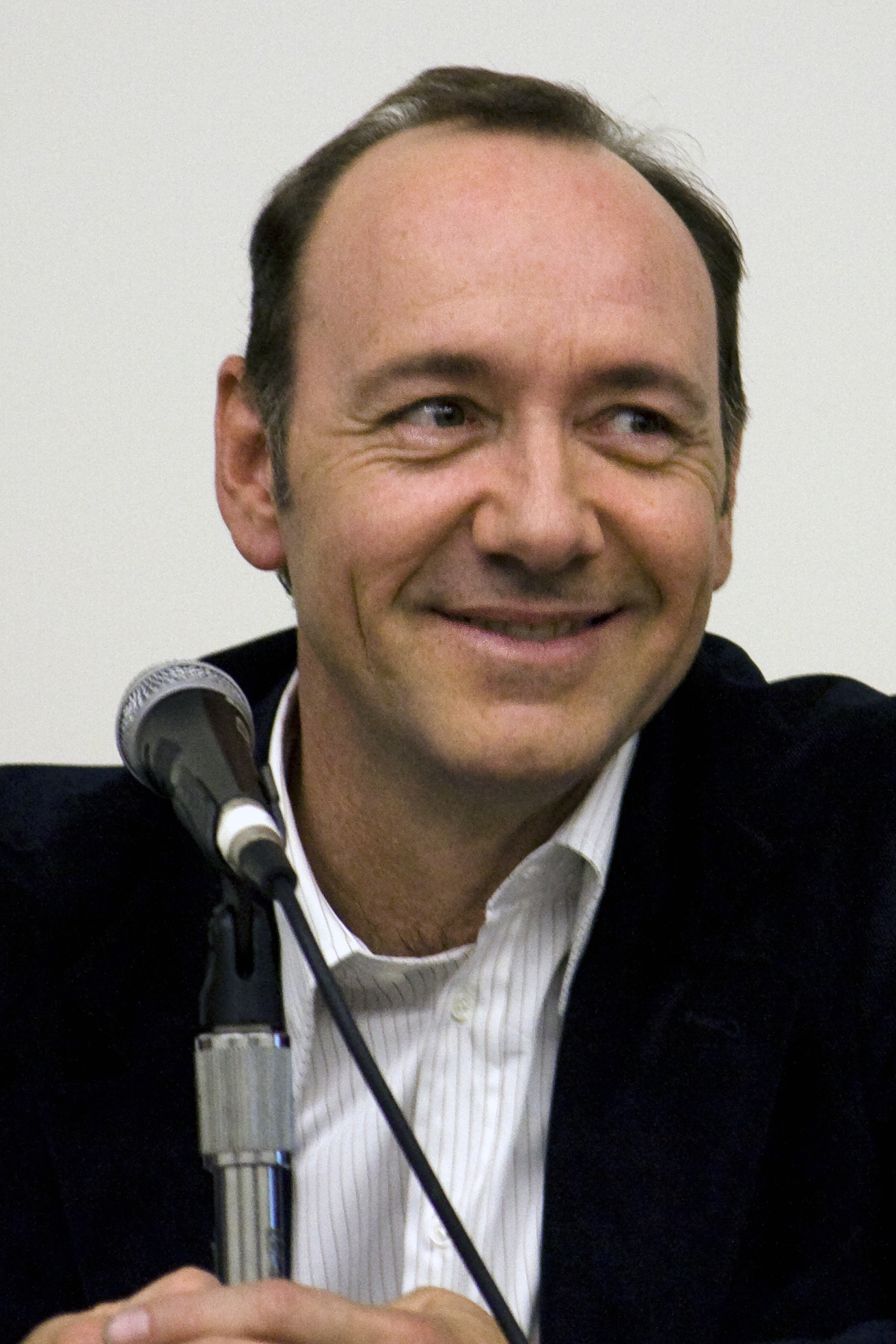
Kevin Spacey won Golden Globe and Screen Actors Guild Awards for his portrayal of Frank Underwood in the second season.

On July 10, 2014, House of Cards earned thirteen Primetime Emmy Award nominations for the 66th Primetime Emmy Awards. Among its nominations were Outstanding Drama Series, Outstanding Lead Actor in a Drama Series for Kevin Spacey, Outstanding Lead Actress in a Drama Series for Robin Wright, Outstanding Writing for a Drama Series for Beau Willimon and Outstanding Directing for a Drama Series for Carl Franklin. The second season was also nominated for several 66th Primetime Creative Arts Emmy Awards, including Kate Mara for Outstanding Guest Actress in a Drama Series and Reg E. Cathey for Outstanding Guest Actor in a Drama Series. Other Creative Arts nominations were received for Casting, Cinematography, Picture Editing, Music Composition, Sound Mixing, and Art Direction.

Other recognitions included a TCA Award for Outstanding Achievement in Drama nomination at the 30th TCA Awards and the Critics' Choice Television Award for Best Actress in a Drama Series for Wright at the 4th Critics' Choice Television Awards. For the 67th Writers Guild of America Awards, the series was nominated for Best Drama Series. For the 21st Screen Actors Guild Awards, the cast was nominated for Best Drama Ensemble, Spacey won for Best Drama Actor, and Wright was nominated for Best Drama Actress. For the 72nd Golden Globe Awards, the series was nominated for Best Television Series – Drama, Wright was nominated for Best Actress – Television Series Drama, and Spacey won for Best Actor – Television Series Drama. For the 67th Directors Guild of America Awards, Jodie Foster was nominated for Outstanding Directing – Drama Series for the episode "Chapter 22".

=== Impact ===
U.S. President Barack Obama joked that he wanted an advance copy of the second series and quipped, "I wish things were that ruthlessly efficient. [...] It's true. I was looking at Kevin Spacey thinking, 'This guy's getting a lot of stuff done.'" The evening before the season was posted, someone responsible for the @BarackObama Twitter account (which was run by Organizing for Action) tweeted a request that no spoilers be posted online.

Since the season debuted on Valentine's Day, The New York Observer created themed cards with quotes from the series such as, "A great man once said everything is about sex. Except sex. Sex is about power." This was an Oscar Wilde quote Underwood used during the first season.

Whereas less than 2% of Netflix subscribers streamed season 1 during the first weekend last year, over 15% streamed at least one hour during the business day on February 14.

== Home media ==
The second season was released on DVD and Blu-ray in region 1 on June 17, 2014, in region 2 on June 16, 2014, and in region 4 on June 19, 2014.
