= Control (2023 film) =

- Directed by: Gene Fallaize
- Written by: Gene Fallaize
- Produced by: Adam Southwick; Emily Hasseldine
- Starring: Lauren Metcalfe; Mark Hampton; Kevin Spacey
- Distributed by: Trinity Creative Partnership
- Release date: December 15, 2023
- Running time: 84 minutes
- Country: United Kingdom
- Language: English

Control is a 2023 British independent action thriller film written and directed by Gene Fallaize, starring Lauren Metcalfe and Mark Hampton and featuring the voice of Kevin Spacey.

== Plot ==
British Home Secretary Stella Simmons drives home one night while engaging in an affair with the Prime Minister when a mysterious man remotely hijacks her self-driving car.

After Stella realises the car has been hijacked she begins trying to escape before the mysterious man calls her. She is told that if she does anything wrong or calls the police he will swerve the car into a wall killing everyone inside.

After some conversation Stella tries to quietly call the prime minister, sneaking her phone out her bag. She is caught out though when the phone audibly buzzes when it receives a call.

Stella is then forced to call the prime minister back and involve him in the mysterious man's game. She informs the prime minister she is being held hostage with the prime ministers child and that he should not do anything.

The mysterious man begins to tell Stella about Courtney a Secretary the Prime Minister got fired after she found out about their affair. The voice tells her that Courtney was disgraced with false claims of drug abuse leading to her suicide. Stella is distraught at learning this claiming she never knew the Prime Minister had caused this.

At this point she is asked to call David's wife and inform her about the affair. Stella refuses leading the man to speed up the car and hit a man crossing the road before pulling to a stop. The man's friends quickly come and start asking Stella to leave the car becoming agitated when she doesn't. Stella panics asking the mysterious man to make them go away. The car suddenly speeds up hitting one of the man's friends who was sat in front of the car.

After that incident Stella agrees to call David's wife. She calls and tells her she has been seeing David, after further prompting from they mysterious man she admits they have been have been having sex since last year. David's wife demands Stella being her daughter home, she yells and threatens Stella before eventually being told of the situation.

== Cast ==
- Kevin Spacey as The Voice
- Lauren Metcalfe as Stella Simmons
- Mark Hampton as Prime Minister David Addams
- Nicola Kelleher as Pamela

== Production ==
In November 2022, it was announced that Spacey was cast for a voice role in the film. The film was shot in London in 2022.

== Release ==
The film was released in the United States and the United Kingdom on December 15, 2023.

== Reception ==
Peter Bradshaw of The Guardian awarded the film two stars out of five. Kevin Maher of The Times also awarded the film two stars out of five. Tim Robey of The Daily Telegraph awarded the film one star out of five.
