= Video games in Sweden =

The first 20 years of video game developing in Sweden included work mostly done by separate individuals. Developing costs increased and the industry structure became more complex over time. Mapping the business of Swedish game developing history has been relatively problematic, because individuals were spread all over the country while working with different platforms in PDP, C64, VIC-20, Amiga, and IBM PC compatibles. Home computers became the focus for the creativity among often self-educated youths who got access during the 1980s.

In 2018, the Swedish games industry generated €1.8 billion and it employed almost 8,000 people. For 2017, there were 4.2 million gamers in Sweden who spent $411.7 million.

== 1980-1989 ==
The colour-graphical VIC-20 home computer was released in 1981. The home computer Commodore 64 was released 1983. The game Space Action (1983) was developed by Arne Fernlund and published by Handic Software.

After 20 years game development shifted towards project groups of game developers.

== List of Swedish video game companies ==
| Name | Description | | Most Famous For | Games |
|---|---|---|---|---|
| Embracer Group | Embracer Group AB (formerly Nordic Games Publishing AB and THQ Nordic AB) is a Swedish video game holding company based in Karlstad. The company was established under the name Nordic Games in December 2008, forming the video game publishing subsidiary of game retailer Game Outlet Europe. | PC, Console | Darksiders | Red Faction, Titan Quest |
| Mojang | Mojang AB is a Swedish video game developer and a studio of Xbox Game Studios based in Stockholm. The studio was founded by Markus Persson in 2009 as Mojang Specifications, inheriting the name from a venture of the same name he left two years prior. | PC, Console, Mobile, VR | Minecraft | Scrolls, Cobalt |
| King (Midasplayer) | King.com Limited, trading as King and also known as King Digital Entertainment, is a video game developer based in St. Julian's, Malta, that specialises in the creation of social games. | Mobile | Candy Crush Saga | Bubble Witch Saga |
| EA Digital Illusions CE | EA Digital Illusions CE AB (DICE) is a Swedish video game developer based in Stockholm. The company was founded in 1992 and has been a subsidiary of Electronic Arts since 2006. | PC, Console, Tech | Battlefield | Mirror's Edge, Star Wars Battlefront |
| Paradox Interactive | Paradox Interactive AB (frequently abbreviated PDX) is a Swedish video game publisher based in Stockholm. | PC | Europa Universalis | Cities: Skylines, Hearts of Iron |
| Avalanche Studios | Fatalist Development AB, doing business as Avalanche Studios, is a Swedish video game developer based in Stockholm. Founded by Linus Blomberg and Christofer Sundberg in March 2003, Avalanche Studios focuses on developing open world projects and bases them on their proprietary Apex game engine (formerly known as Avalanche Engine). | PC, Console, Tech | Just Cause | Rage 2, Mad Max, Generation Zero |
| Ubisoft Entertainment Sweden (Massive) | Massive Entertainment is a Swedish video game developer and a studio of Ubisoft based in Malmö. The company has been fully owned by Ubisoft since 2008. | PC, Console, Tech, Mobile | Tom Clancy's The Division | Tom Clancy's The Division 2, Just Dance Now |
| Starbreeze | Starbreeze Studios AB is a Swedish video game developer and publisher based in Stockholm. Notable games developed include The Chronicles of Riddick: Escape from Butcher Bay, Payday 2 and Brothers: A Tale of Two Sons. | PC, Console, Mobile, VR, Tech | Payday Series | The Chronicles of Riddick: Escape from Butcher Bay, Syndicate |
| MAG Interactive | | Mobile, Facebook | Ruzzle | Word Brain |
| Fatshark | Fatshark is an independent video game development studio based in Stockholm, Sweden. | PC, Console, Mobile | Warhammer Series | Warhammer: Vermintide 2, Escape Dead Island, War of the Vikings |
| Hazelight Studios AB | | PC, Console | A Way Out (video game) | Brothers - A Tale of Two Sons |
| (Axolot Games) | | PC | Scrap Mechanic | Raft |
| Toca Boca | Toca Boca is a Swedish app development studio focused on child-friendly applications for tablets and smartphones. | Mobile | Toca Series | Paint my wings |
| MachineGames Sweden | MachineGames agreed with Bethesda Softworks to develop a new instalment in the Wolfenstein series, and was acquired by Bethesda's parent company, ZeniMax Media. | PC, Console | Wolfenstein Series | Quake: Dimension of the Past |
| G5 Entertainment | G5 Entertainment is a Swedish video game developer that produces free-to-play games. The company was founded by Aleksandr Tabunov, Sergey Shults and Vlad Suglobov in 2001. | PC, Mobile | Hidden City | Sherlock, Jewels of Rome, Jewels of Egypt, Jewels of the Wild West |
| GamersGate | GamersGate is a Sweden-based online video game store offering electronic strategy guides and games for Windows, OS X, and Linux via direct download. | Distribution, PC, Mac | Fallout 4 | Borderlands, Skyrim, BioShock 2 |
| Donya labs (Simplygon) | | Technology | | |
| Arrowhead Game Studios | Arrowhead Game Studios AB is an independent Swedish video game developer, established in 2008 by a group of Luleå University of Technology students. | PC, Console, Mac | Magicka | Helldivers, Helldivers 2, The Showdown Effect |
| MindArk | MindArk is a Swedish software company located in Gothenburg. | PC, Mobile, VR | Entropia Universe | |
| Tarsier Studios | | PC, Console, VR, Handheld | Little Big Planet Series | Little Nightmares, Tearaway Unfolded |
| Image & Form International | | PC, Console, Mobile, Handheld | Steamworld Series | Anthill |
| Frictional Games | | PC | Amnesia | SOMA, Penumbra Series |
| Raw Fury | Raw Fury is a Swedish video game publisher, specialising in the publication of indie games, based in Stockholm. | PC, Mac, Console | Kingdom: Two Crowns | Mosaic |
| Illusion Labs | | Mobile, Mac | Touchgrind | Way of the Turtle |
| Illwinter Game Design | | PC, Mac | Dominions Series | Erövring av Elysium |
| Zoink | Zoink AB was founded in 2001 by Klaus Lyngeled, who acts as its CEO. | PC, Console, VR, Mobile, Mac | Fe | Flipping Death |
| Power Challenge | | Online, Service | ManagerZone | Power Soccer |
| Sector3 Studios | | Console | | WTCC, ADAC GT Masters |
| Simogo | | Mobile, Console, Service | Year Walk | Device 6 |
| Code Club(Onetoofree) | | PC, Mac | Wurm Online | Wurm Unlimited |
| Defold | | Tech | | |
| Might and Delight | Might and Delight is a Swedish video game development studio and publisher based in Stockholm. The studio was established in 2010 and is best known for the Shelter series. | PC, Mac, Console | Shelter | PID |
| Creative Vault AB | | Console, VR | Wipeout™ VR | Hustle Kings VR, Crash Commando |
| Poppermost Productions | Poppermost Productions is a small independent game developer based in Stockholm, Sweden. | PC, Console | Snow | |
| Grapefrukt | | Mobile, Console, PC, Web, Tablet | Rymdkapsel | twofold inc., gran chorizo |
| Legendo Entertainment | Legendo Entertainment is a Sweden-based entertainment company, led by CEO Björn Larsson. Founded under the name "Iridon Interactive," in 1998, the company adopted its current title of “Legendo Entertainment,” in 2004. | PC, Mac, Mobile, Console, Handheld, AR, Service, Tablet | Serpents in the Mist | FCB Pinball, Fortune Winds |
| Oxeye Game Studio | Cobalt is an action side-scrolling video game developed by Oxeye Game Studio and published by Mojang. | PC, Console, Mac | Cobalt | Strategist, Harvest: Massive Encounter |
| White Wolf Entertainment (defunct) | | PC, Console | The Chronicles of Darkness | Exalted, World of Darkness |
| Thunderful Publishing | Thunderful AB is a Swedish video game holding company based in Gothenburg. It was founded in December 2017 by Brjánn Sigurgeirsson and Klaus Lyngeled, in conjunction with Bergsala Holding, as the parent company for their Gothenburg-based game development studios, Image & Form and Zoink. | PC, Console, Mobile, Steam, VR, Mac | | Ghost Giant, Curious Expedition |
| Ghost Games | Subsidiary of Electronic Arts | PC, Console | Need for Speed | Need for Speed Heat, Need for Speed Payback |
| Atod | Atod AB/LG Software AB (also known as 42-Bit AB) was a video game developer located in Helsingborg, Sweden. | Console | | Hot Weels Extreme Racing |
| Dennaton Games | Dennaton Games is an independent Swedish video game developer founded by programmer Jonatan Söderström and artist Dennis Wedin. | PC, Mac, Mobile | Hotline Miami | Hotline Miami 2: Wrong Number |
| Nifflas | Nicklas Nygren, better known by the handle Nifflas, is an independent Swedish video game developer. | Console, Handheld, Mac, PC | Knytt | Within A Deep Forest, FiNCK, NightSky |
| Overkill Software | Overkill Software is a Swedish video game developer based and founded in Stockholm in 2009 by Ulf Andersson, Bo Andersson and Simon Viklund, the founders and owners of now defunct game developer Grin. | PC, Mobile, Console | | Overkill's The Walking Dead, Payday: The Heist, Payday 2 |
| The Sleeping Machine | The Sleeping Machine AB, formerly Cockroach Inc. till 2011, is an independent Swedish video game developer design & animation studio established in 2007 by Anders Gustafsson and Erik Zaring. | Mac, PC, Browser game | The Dream Machine | Gateway, The Gateway Trilogy |

== See also ==
- List of video game companies of Sweden (Check this for possible extra details of relevant companies & their pages)
