= List of video game companies of Sweden =

This is a list of video game companies originating from Sweden.

== Notable developers ==
- 10 Chambers AB
- Aftnareld
- AmberWing
- Armchair Developers
- Arrowhead Game Studios
- Art of Sully (Aka. "SULLY")
- Atod
- Aurora Punks (collective)
  - Limit Break Studio (Note: Limit Break Studio has no relation to an US game studio.)
  - LootLocker (Backend tools)
  - Pixadome Games
  - Wimasima
- Avalanche Studios
  - Expansive Worlds
  - Systemic Reaction
- Bear Twigs
- Blackfox Studios AB
- Blamorama Games AB
- Blue Goo Games AB
- Caspian Interactive
- Chromatic Ink
- Chronocle
- Clifftop Games AB
- Cockroach Inc.
- Cresthelm Studios
- DeadToast Entertainment AB
- Dennaton Games
- Devm Games
- Doomlord Interactive AB
- DoubleMoose Games AB (Former publisher)
- EA DICE
- Ember Paw Games
- Embracer Group
  - Amplifier Game Invest (Some of its devs are Swedish. Ex-Goodbye Kansas Game Invest AB (2016-2020).)
    - A Creative Endeavor
    - Fall Damage Studio
    - Frame Break
    - Green Tile Digital
    - Kavalri Games
    - Neon Giant
    - Palindrome Interactive AB (Also publisher)
    - Plucky Bytes
    - Tarsier Studios
  - Coffee Stain Holding
    - Box Dragon
    - Coffee Stain Studios (4 branches)
    - Easy Trigger
    - Lavapotion
  - Embracer Freemode
    - Bitwave Games (Ex-Retroid Interactive AB in 2014-2022)
    - Clear River Games AB (publisher)
    - Game Outlet Europe (distributor)
- Enad Global 7 (Holding group. Ex-Toadman Interactive AB (2013-2020).)
- Experiment 101
- Faravid Interactive
- Far Out Games
- Fatshark
- FeWes Games
- Fredaikis AB (Also co-dev: games, web, software, security)
- Friendly Fire Games
- Frogsong Studios AB (Also co-dev. Former publisher.)
- Frojo Apps
- Frictional Games
- Ghost Games
- Grenaa Games
- Hadoque
- Hazelight Studios
- Hello There AB (Former publisher)
- HolmCom
- IDUN Interactive AB
- Illwinter Game Design
- Iron Gate Studio
- Jadestone Group
- Jumpgate AB (Publishing group. Ex-Three Gates AB in 2011-2021)
  - Tableflip Entertainment (Also co-dev)
- KasperDev
- Keepsake Games AB (Has former Hazelight/Coffee Stain/Mojang/DICE people)
- Legendo Entertainment (Ex-Iridon Interactive)
- Let It Roll AB
- Liquid Swords (Setup by Avalanche Studios co-founder)
- Lutra Interactive
- Malformation Games (Aka Malformation AB. HQ.)
- MachineGames
- Martin Magni (creator of Fancade)
- Massive Entertainment
- Might and Delight
- MindArk
- Mirage Game Studios
- Mojang
- MoonHood AB
- Nifflas
- Nodbrim Interactive AB (Former publisher)
- Overflow Games
- Paradox Development Studio
- Pathos Interactive AB
- Philisophic Games
- Pixleon Games
- Planeshift Interactive
- Plausible Concept AB
- Powersnake
- Pugstorm Game Studios
- Redbeet Interactive
- Redikod
- Resolution Games
- Ringtail Games
- River End Games
- Section 9 Interactive AB
- SetShape Studio
- Silkworm Games
- SimBin Studios
- Simogo
- Skygoblin
- Solid Core
- SolidIcon
- Southend Interactive
- Starbreeze AB (Holding group. Starbreeze Studios merged into O3 Games in 2001. Group renamed Starbreeze in 2002.)
  - Starbreeze Studios
    - Overkill Software
- Star Stable Entertainment
- Stunlock Studios
- Sutur Studio
- Team Psykskallar
- The Bearded Ladies Consulting
- The Fine Arc Nordic AB
- The Outsiders
- Thunderful Development AB
  - Guru Games (Aka Guiding Rules Games AB. Publisher & dev.)
  - Image & Form (Publisher & dev)
  - Stormteller Games (Ex-Thunderful Gothenburg in 2017-2025)
  - The Station (Also Station Interactive AB. Dev, porting; former publisher.)
  - Zoink (Publisher & dev)
- Toppluva AB
- Triassic Games AB (Offices in Sweden, Germany & Poland)
- Tuxedo Labs
- Tymedust Games
- VRESKI
- Windup Games
- Wishfully Studios
- Wonderscope AB
- Yarnot Games
- Zordix AB
  - Dimfrost Studio

=== Misc games ===
- Blue Scarab Entertainment AB (Online games)
- Chief Rebel AB (Online games)
- Cortopia Studios (Also Cortopia AB. VR/AR. Former publisher.)
- Gellyberry Studios (Online games)
- Really Interactive (VR/AR. Also co-dev: VR/AR, core & mobile games.)
- Stillfront Group (Holding group. Mobile & online games.)
  - Coldwood Interactive
  - Power Challenge AB

=== Co-development ===
- Goodbye Kansas Studios AB (Cutscenes, mo-cap, custom 3d animation. Former: voice recording. Ex-Northern Light Studios (2004? till 2009); Imagination Studios AB (2009-2017).)
- Two Feathers Studio HB (Sound & music production)

=== Defunct developers ===
- Amuze (Founded 1996. Defunct 2005.)
- Bitsquid AB (Founded 2009. Acquired by Autodesk in mid 2014. Website down 2015. Ceased work in 2018. Middleware engine.)
- Bonnier Multimedia AB (Founded 1993. Defunct 2002.)
- Colossai Studios AB (Founded 2005. Website down early 2014.)
- ComputerHouse GBG AB (Founded 1996. Defunct 2001.)
- Daydream Software (Swedish dev. Founded 1994. Defunct 2004. Different to later Spanish dev 'Daydream Software SLL'.)
- GRIN (Founded 1997. Defunct 2009.)
- Hajtech Produktioner (Founded 1997. Defunct 2004.)
- Lockpick Entertainment (Founded 2004. Defunct 2011. Online game & co-development.)
- Meqon Research AB (Founded 2002. Acquired by AGEIA Technologies in 2005. Physics engine middleware.)
- Paradox Arctic (Founded 2014. Closed 2023. Part of Paradox Interactive. Co-dev & porting.)
- Paradox North AB (Founded 2013. Ceased 2016. Part of Paradox Interactive. Also co-dev.)
- Paradox South AB (Founded 2012. Closed 2016. Co-dev division of Paradox Interactive.)
- Pixeldiet Entertainment AB (Founded 2011. Inactive after 2020. Co-development.)
- Refraction Games (Founded 1998. Merged with DICE in 2000.)
- Termite Games (Ex-Insomnia Software in 1997 to 2000. Acquired by Dutch publisher, Project 3 Interactive in 2002. Defunct 2006.)
- Unique Development Studios AB (Founded 1993. Defunct 2004. Games.)
- Villa Gorilla AB (Founded 2013. Defunct 2018.)

== Notable publishers ==
- Ashes & Diamonds Entertainment AB (Marketing & video game consultancy)
- Aonic AB (Holding group)
  - Megabit Publishing
- Aurora Punks
- Beyond Frames Entertainment AB (XR games)
- Coffee Stain Publishing (Publishing division of Coffee Stain Studios AB)
- Killmonday Games AB
- Mighty Diamonds (Video game consultancy)
- PAN Vision AB (Ex-PAN Interactive from 1998 till 2001. Publisher & distributor.) (SV wiki, FI wiki)
- Paradox Interactive
- Raw Fury
- Snapbreak Games AB (Games. Mostly mobile.)
- Spelkollektivet
- Starbreeze Publishing AB (Separate publishing arm of Starbreeze Studios AB)
- Thunderful Publishing AB
  - Bergsala (Distributor for Nintendo supplies. Former publisher.)
- WINGS Interactive (Trading name of Vingar Interaktiva AB. Publisher & funding.)

=== Publisher & developer firms ===
- 5 Fortress AB (Online games)
- Allvis STHLM AB
- Angry Demon Studio
- Apoapsis Game Laboratories AB (Also Apog Labs. Ex-Apoapsis Studios in 2017-2021.)
- Apskeppet AB (From founder of older dev, Free Lunch Design AB)
- Athletic Design AB (Online games)
- Atomic Elbow AB
- Axolot Games
- Black Voyage Games AB (HQ)
- Brimstone Games AB (HQ)
- Bumblebee Studios (Also BBS Games AB)
- Classy Lemon (AVN games)
- Composition GS
- Crackshell AB (Firm's games)
- Cult of the North AB (Online games)
- Diax Arts (Ex-Diax Game AB)
- Doublecap Games
- Early Morning Studio
- El Huervo AB
- Embark Studios (Online games)
- Fast Travel Games AB (VR)
- Flamebait Games
- Gamatron AB
- Gaming Corps AB (Mostly mobile & iGaming content)
- Haenir Studio
- Hörberg Productions
- Jumpgate AB (Ex-Three Gates AB in 2011-2021)
- Kikimora Games
- King (Mobile & casual games)
- Landell Games AB
- Landfall Games AB
- Midjiwan AB
- Morgondag (Games, tools, web)
- North Modding Company AB
- Perfect Random
- Pixel Ferrets
- Pounce Light AB
- Pretty Fly Games AB (Ex-CasualGames.nu; Casual Games FK AB in 2013-2021)
- RednapGames
- RobTop Games AB (Mobile games)
- Rymdfall AB
- semiwork (Also Semiwork Studios AB)
- Sharkmob (Online games)
- Shotgun Anaconda
- Snowprint Studios AB (Online games)
- Something We Made
- Striped Panda Studios
- Swarm Creations AB
- The Gang Sweden AB (HQ. Core & ad games.)
- Turborilla AB (HQ. Mobile focused.)
- VoDoo Studios
- Wicket Gaming AB (Mobile & F2P sports games)
- Woodhill Interactive
- Xekvera
- Y/CJ/Y (Simple name: YCJY Games)

=== Defunct publishers ===
- E-game AB (Founded 1998. Inactive after 2001. Publisher & dev.)
- Echo Entertainment (Founded 2018. Defunct late 2023. Publisher & dev.)
- Free Lunch Design AB (Founded 1998. Bought by Muskedunder Interactive AB in 2008. Inactive after 2012. Now part of Apskeppet.)
- Isbit Games AB (Founded 2014. Inactive after 2020. Publisher, dev & co-dev.)
- Pieces Interactive (Founded 2007. Closed 2024. Publisher & dev.)
- Shortfuse Games AB (Founded 2007. Acquired by Pieces Interactive in 2012. Publisher & dev.)
- Software of Sweden (Founded 1986. Inactive after 1998. Publisher & dev.)
- The Working Parts HB (Founded 2011. Inactive after 2020. Publisher & dev.)
- TimeTrap AB (Founded 2008. Inactive after 2011. Website down after 2017. Publisher & dev.)
- Toadman Interactive (Founded 2013. Dev division closed 2025 by Enad Global 7. Publisher, dev, co-dev.)

== See also ==
- Video games in Sweden
- List of video game companies
- Lists of video games
- Video game developer
- Video game publisher
