= Knytt Stories =

2007 video game

- Developer: Nifflas
- Publisher: Nifflas
- Series: Knytt
- Engine: Multimedia Fusion
- Platform: Windows
- Release: 28 August 2007
- Genres: Adventure game, metroidvania
- Mode: Single-player

Knytt Stories is a 2007 indie adventure video game and platformer developed and published by Swedish developer Nifflas. The sequel to Knytt and part of the Knytt trilogy, it was released for Windows in August 2007, and was ported to Nintendo DS by Rodrigo Roman in 2010 as the open source homebrew software Knytt Stories DS with the support of the original developer. The game's initial scenario, "The Machine", follows the protagonist Juni as she attempts to stop a machine from sucking the life out of the world. An official expansion the same year added more sets of levels. It also contains a full level editor, allowing for fans to create and release their own downloadable levels. The game received widespread critical praise for its engaging gameplay and graphics. It received a sequel, Knytt Underground, in 2012.

== Gameplay ==
Knytt Stories is a 2D platformer in which the players control Juni, a female knytt, as she traverses levels and gains new abilities that allow access to different areas, such as faster speed, a higher jump, and a double jump. Juni is unable to attack, and must dodge to escape threats.

== Development ==
Knytt Stories was created to be accessible even for non-gamers. It was designed without a typical HUD in order to enhance immersion and make it more similar to real life. Instead, difficulty is controlled by a switch within the game itself.

== Reception ==
John Walker of Rock Paper Shotgun described the game as "beautiful", calling its double jumps "satisfying" and its level design "spot-on". Saying that it was "enhanced considerably by superb aesthetics", he also called the music "wonderful". He summed up the game as displaying "a sense of cuteness without cloy" and "careful simplicity". Hardcore Gamer wrote that the game had "beautiful" landscapes and was "off to an excellent start", remarking positively on its non-violent gameplay. Mike Rose wrote in 250 Indie Games You Must Play that the user-created stories were "excellent", recommending the game.

Knytt Stories was named Edge's "Internet Game of the Month" in December 2007, the publication describing it as "finely tuned" and "reminiscent of the original Metroid games", further noting that the gameplay was accompanied by "beautiful ambient music".
