= Knytt Underground =

2012 video game

- The logo screen from the main menu, a playable area of the game
- Developers: Green Hill Games; Nifflas' Games
- Publisher: Ripstone
- Director: Nifflas
- Programmer: Maurice Sibrandi
- Series: Knytt
- Engine: PhyreEngine
- Platforms: Linux, Microsoft Windows, OS X, PlayStation 3, PlayStation Vita, Wii U
- Release: PlayStation 3, PlayStation Vita: NA: 18 December 2012; PAL: 21 December 2012; Linux, OS X, Windows; 25 October 2013; Wii U 19 December 2013
- Genres: Adventure, platform
- Mode: Single-player

Knytt Underground is an adventure-platform video game developed by Green Hill Games and Nifflas' Games and published by Ripstone for the PlayStation 3 and PlayStation Vita. It is the second sequel to Nifflas' previous game Knytt. The game offers two playable characters, nonlinear gameplay, multiple endings, and a large number of side-quests and secrets.

== Gameplay ==
Knytt Underground is a side-scrolling open action-adventure, with the exploration of a metroidvania. Its gameplay fuses the mechanics of Nifflas' earlier games. From Knytt it borrows the freedom to climb vertical walls as well as being able to safely fall from any height (barring hazards like lava and acid, but unlike Knytt water is not hazardous). From Within a Deep Forest it incorporates the ability to transform into a bouncing ball. However, there is only one ball "material" and different abilities must be gained by flowers that bestow temporary power-ups which are only usable in Sprite form, a new feature introduced in Underground.

There are no hostile characters or antagonists in the story except for robots that follow a preset behavior and are confined to the room they spawn in. The player may interact with various NPCs and receive quests from them. Some characters may become traveling companions and influence certain events. The player also has an inventory system for items which are used for trading, completing tasks or gaining access to certain areas.

The game is set in a post-apocalyptic future where the surface has been rendered uninhabitable. Humans no longer exist and the surviving creatures all live underground, although remnants of human technology are commonplace. There are different factions within the subterranean world such as the mystical Myriadists and a group called the Internet dedicated to salvaging human artifacts.

The main world is divided into 47 rooms across by 29 rooms down, for a total of at least 1,363 rooms. However, there are many secret areas that exist off the in-game map, leading to over 1,800 total locations in all. Each region of the world has a distinct visual theme and some areas are analogous to the levels in Within a Deep Forest. Shortcuts for quickly traveling across large distances can be found via an alternative dimension called "the Disorder".

== Plot ==
The player controls Mi Sprocket, a "sprite" who sets out to make a wish at the Fairy Springs, but due to her inability to speak, she is misunderstood by everyone and unwillingly recruited into a mission to save the world. Two of the fairies decide to accompany her; Cilia the Moon Fairy and Dora the Sun Fairy. They provide the majority of the dialogue within the game and each has her individual temperament, often in contrast to each other. Mi has to choose which fairy to send to speak on her behalf when initiating conversations with NPCs, and they can influence which quests the player is able to take and may even affect the outcome of those quests.

Mi's primary goal involves ringing the Six Bells of Fate, a task which falls upon a member of the Sprocket family every six hundred years and is required by prophecy to prevent the destruction of the world. There are numerous side quests as well and most may be completed in multiple ways, awarding the player with different achievements and endings. Underground often breaks the fourth wall, with the developer himself making appearances as an NPC and various characters making remarks on common video-game clichés, including the apparent pointlessness of the main quest.

== Development ==
In July 2012, Nifflas announced that he was working on Knytt Underground, and that it is his biggest game yet. It was released on the PlayStation Network for PlayStation 3 and PS Vita in late December 2012, and the console versions include extra content. The game was released on Steam on 25 October 2013. A Wii U version of the game was confirmed in August 2013, and was being ported by Nygren's colleague Mathias Kærlev. The game was released on 19 December 2013 in both North America and Europe. Underground was Nifflas' biggest project at the time of its release, encompassing the biggest world and the most characters, sub-quests and secrets of any of his games thus far.

== Soundtrack ==
Besides Nifflas' own songs, Knytt Underground includes music by D Fast, David Kanaga, Fredrik Häthén, LPChip, Jonas Mattebo, Stephen Ascher, Void Pointer, and Yann Van Der Cruyssen. The soundtrack is available as a free download.
