= Shelter 2 =

2015 video game

- Developer: Might and Delight
- Composer: Retro Family
- Engine: Unity
- Platforms: Microsoft Windows, OS X, Linux
- Release: March 9, 2015
- Genre: Survival
- Mode: Single-player

Shelter 2 is an open world survival video game developed by Might and Delight for Windows, Mac OS X, and Linux. The game is a sequel to 2013's Shelter. It was released on March 9, 2015 and, like its predecessor, was made available on Steam as a digital download.

== Gameplay ==
In Shelter 2 the player controls a mother lynx, looking after her kittens by keeping them fed and safe from danger. The game aimed to contain new types of movement compared to the original, a bigger variety of prey, and a larger open world which changes during the four seasons. Additional instructions are available to the player such as instructing the cubs to drink from a river. The player must make sure the cubs are safely back in the family's den at night time and the seasons affect what food and water is available.

The game starts with the mother lynx pregnant and preparing a den. The player is able to name each of the kittens, and those which survive a playthrough are playable as the next generation of the family tree.

== Development ==
In March 2014 Might and Delight announced the development of Shelter 2, releasing a teaser trailer and setting a release date of Autumn 2014. The game was delayed to March 9, 2015 in October 2014 after the developers announced a different game would be released first, The Blue Flamingo.

== Reception ==
GameSpot awarded Shelter 2 a score of 6 out of 10, saying that it "has the right spirit, the right ideas, and it is once again hamstrung by its inability to go the extra, needed mile to do them justice". Destructoid was more critical, awarding it 3 out of 10 and saying "something went wrong somewhere along the line."

== Expansions ==
Shelter 2: Mountains was released on 25 August 2015. It adds a whole new area with new dangers that you can turn off in the main menu. New dangers include the fox, eagle, forest fire, and bear. The mountains are located north of the den area.
