= Chapter Two =

Chapter Two refers to the second chapter in a book.

Chapter Two, Chapter 2, or Chapter II may also refer to:

== Film ==
- Chapter Two (film), a 1979 adaptation of Neil Simon's play
- KGF: Chapter 2, 2022 Indian period action film
- Khuda Haafiz: Chapter 2, 2022 Indian film by Faruk Kabir
- Totapuri: Chapter 2, a 2023 Indian Kannada-language film by Vijaya Prasad
- Kesari Chapter 2, a 2025 Indian Hindi-language film
- Bicchugatti: Chapter 2, an upcoming Indian Kannada-language film
- Dhruva Natchathiram: Chapter Two, an upcoming Indian Tamil-language film
- Kaliachak Chapter 2, an upcoming Indian Bengali-language film
- Kantara (2022 film), an Indian Kannada-language film, retroactively titled Kantara: Chapter 2 (after the release of its prequel Kantara: Chapter 1)
- Mafia: Chapter 2, an upcoming Indian Tamil-language film

== Music ==
- Chapter 2 (g.o.d album), 1999
- Chapter 2: The Voice, an album by Syleena Johnson, 2002
- Chapter 2: World Domination, an album by Three 6 Mafia, 1997
- Chapter II (Ashanti album), 2003
- Chapter II (Benga album), 2013
- Chapter II: Family Reunion, an album by Mo Thugs, 1998
- Chapter II, an EP by the Audition, 2012
- Chapter Two (Roberta Flack album), 1970
- Chapter Two (Sacred System album), 1997
- Chapter Two (Viking Skull album), 2007
- Chapter Two: Hasta Siempre, an album by Gato Barbieri, 1974
- Chapter Two: Red, an EP by Bea Miller, 2017
- Chapter 2, a 2003 album by Jessica Riddle
- Chapter Dos, 2008 album by Xtreme
- Chapter II: Legacy, 2021 album by Ad Infinitum
- "Chapter 2", a song by the Joy Formidable from The Big Roar, 2011

== Plays ==
- Chapter Two (play), a 1977 play by Neil Simon

== Television ==
- "Chapter 2" (American Horror Story)
- "Chapter 2" (Eastbound & Down)
- "Chapter 2" (House of Cards)
- "Chapter 2" (Legion)
- "Chapter 2" (Star Wars: Clone Wars), an episode of Star Wars: Clone Wars
- "Chapter 2" (Uncoupled)
- "Chapter 2: The Child", an episode of The Mandalorian
- "Chapter 2: The Silver Doe, an episode of A Murder at the End of the World
- "Chapter 2: The Tribes of Tatooine", an episode of The Book of Boba Fett
- "Chapter Two" (Boston Public)
- "Chapter Two: The Dark Baptism", an episode of Chilling Adventures of Sabrina
- "Chapter Two: The Deep End", an episode of Special
- "Chapter Two: A Touch of Evil", an episode of Riverdale
- "Chapter Two: Use It", an episode of Barry
- "Chapter Two: You Can't Hurry Love", an episode of Katy Keene
- Episodes of Stranger Things:
  - "Chapter Two: The Weirdo on Maple Street", season 1
  - "Chapter Two: Trick or Treat, Freak", season 2
  - "Chapter Two: The Mall Rats", season 3
  - "Chapter Two: Vecna's Curse", season 4
  - "Chapter Two: The Vanishing of Holly Wheeler", season 5

== Chapters ==
- Al-Baqarah, the second chapter of Quran
- Chapter II of the Constitution of Australia
- Chapter II of the United Nations Charter
- Chapter Two of the Constitution of South Africa

== Other uses ==
- ECW Chapter 2, a 1997 professional wrestling event.

== See also ==
- Second Chapter, an album by Danny Kirwan, 1975
- Hindutva Chapter Two, an Indian film by Karan Razdan
- Jora: The Second Chapter, a 2020 Indian Punjabi-language film
