= Scrap Mechanic =

- Promotional cover art
- Developer: Axolot Games
- Publisher: Axolot Games
- Directors: Kacper Antonius; Pontus Holmbom
- Platform: Windows
- Release: 24 July 2026: Early access 20 January 2016; Full release 24 July 2026
- Genres: Sandbox, survival
- Modes: Single-player, multiplayer

Scrap Mechanic is a sandbox video game developed for Windows by Swedish game studio and publisher Axolot Games, in which players can build machines, vehicles, and buildings, and share their creations online. The game launched in early access for Windows on January 20, 2016, with a creative mode and unlimited access to all available parts for building. On the day of its release, it was the top-selling game on Steam and is estimated to have achieved 2–3 million sales. The survival mode update for the game, with new game mechanics including wildlife, scavenging, farming, and cooking, as well as an underwater biome, was released on May 7, 2020. It was the third-best-selling game on Steam the week after the update. The second chapter of the survival mode was made available on July 24, 2026, alongside the game's full release.

== Plot ==
The survival backstory depicts the setting of the game. It portrays a robot maintenance mechanic that has been sent to an agricultural planet which supplies food to the metropolitan planets. The crew has been tasked to maintain fully autonomous farming robots which overrun the planet. However, as the spacecraft comes in for a landing it loses control and crashes. The mechanic survives the impact, however becoming stranded and finds out that the robots working in the fields have become hostile and start attacking the mechanics. The goal is now to survive on the planet, using the mechanics quick thinking, creativity and environment as an advantage to stay alive from the savage robots.

== Gameplay ==
Players begin at the site of a crashed spaceship, with very few items. Inside the crashed spaceship the player must find a Master Battery—which is located in a ruin nearby—and place it into the Master Battery Socket located in the crashed spaceship, by doing this, the player activates the Mini Craftbot, and the Ship Terminal. The Mini Craftbot is a more simple and smaller version of the Craftbot with limited functionality, primarily focused on allowing players to build a basic vehicle to begin exploring the world. The Ship Terminal allows players to receive the Logbook which indicates the time of day, the day they're on, the dialogs that players receive via a phone located at the mechanic station, current and completed quests and a list of creations that the player made in the garage. Players must search for supplies and food in order to survive.

The Mechanic Station is the location where the various crafting stations can be made. This includes the Craftbot, the Dressbot, made for making clothing, the Refinebot for refining raw materials, and the Cookbot, for combining raw foods into recipes. In addition, a Resource Collector can crafted which is used for collecting and storing various resources and transferring them to Refinebot.

The Farmers Hideout is the location where trading is performed for unlocking the recipes for various items such as pistons, logic gates, various spud guns and many others. The player can trade trapped farmers and crates of food.

Other locations include structures such as the Growlabs filled with enemies and new seeds, the Silo District or Ruin City filled with enemies, loot crates, and ruin chests; the Farmers Hideout, where items can be purchased using produce and captive farmers as currency (though the use of the latter as a means of exchange has caused many in the community to speculate that the farmers are sold into slavery); the Farmers Shacks that can be harvested for blocks, parts and other resources; and Warehouses, large buildings storing more advanced supplies.

=== Creative mode ===
In creative mode, players start with full access to an unlimited supply of all items in the game, allowing for the creation of a variety of buildings, vehicles, and machines, none of which require energy or fuel to function. There are no enemies nor animals in the world naturally, but they can be spawned by the player with spawn capsules. In this mode, players cannot be injured or die. There are also harvestable crops from survival mode such as trees and stone as well as crafting stations, allowing for players to test all sorts of contraptions. Creations can be saved and shared via the Steam workshop.

=== Challenge mode ===
In challenge mode, players will try and get through 50 levels by building or fixing contraptions using the limited materials they are given. A challenge builder is also available for players to build and share their own challenge levels through the Steam workshop. Challenge levels can be downloaded and published in the Steam workshop. Originally, challenge mode was a developer's experiment with encryption mechanics, not allowing buildings to be deleted, which has evolved into its whole separate game mode.

=== Drilling Thunder update (1.0) ===
The Drilling Thunder update released on July 24, 2026. It added new quests, overhauled shaders and lighting, rebalanced gameplay mechanics, added new block types and interactive parts, a new flammable block mechanic, and new tools and consumables. The update also included a dekotora set, inspired by the Japanese dekotora automobile decoration.

== Development ==
Scrap Mechanic formerly used the OGRE rendering engine, which stands for Object-Oriented Graphics Rendering Engine. It was used alongside a custom plugin named Bullet, which is an external physics engine responsible for all of the physics calculations.

However, the engine was changed with the first major update. The new in-house rendering engine had been in development since August and was made to fix numerous bugs, mostly related to certain integrated Intel cards, which some players had issues with.

Scrap Mechanic released the Drilling thunder update on July 24, 2026.

== Online controversy ==
In 2025, popular content Canadian content creator Durf removed the popular Scrap Mechanic mod "The Modpack" from public access on the Steam Workshop. This sparked intense controversy, as the mod was the most popular user-made game modification on the Workshop, with over 800,000 subscriptions prior to its deletion. Durf also engaged in online harassment, greatly undermining the game's reputation, especially in regards to its Drilling Thunder (1.0) release. Players' prolonged wait for the update was particularly demoralizing, the reputation of Axolot Games being ruined by allegations of passivity, abandoning the playerbase, and a complete lack of transparency.

== Reception ==
Angus Morrison of PC Gamer compared the game to Minecraft, noting that in the context of the latter's lack of mechanical building conditions, the game might be attractive to players who like to build mechanics.

Nathan Grayson of Kotaku said that the game "struck him as a game intrepid builders won't tire of anytime soon," and claimed that he was looking forward to seeing what comes of it, Curtis Pyke of MGN called the game "a farming simulator meets tower defense game".
