= Shelter (video game) =

2013 video game

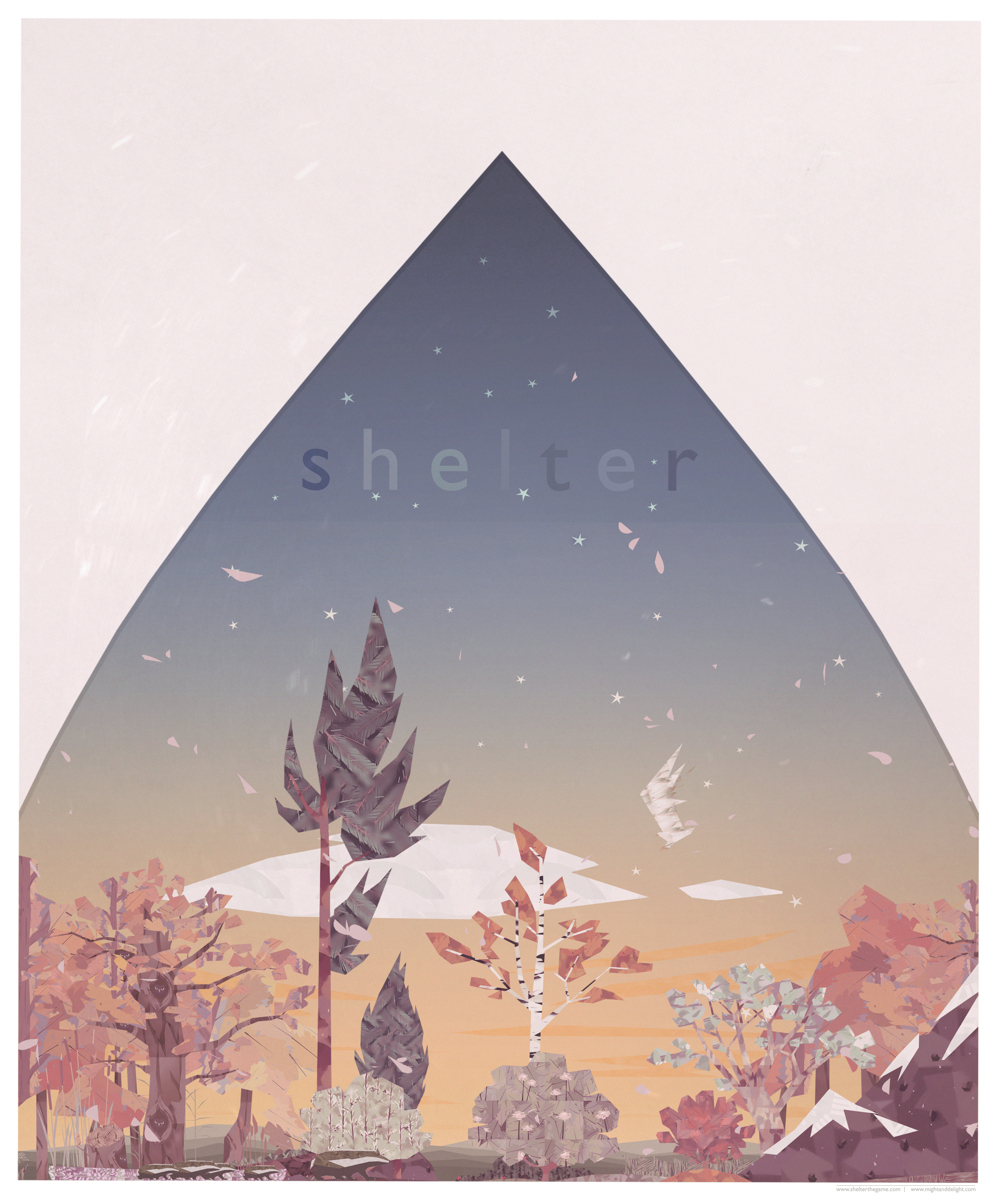
- Poster for Shelter
- Developer: Might and Delight
- Director: Johannes Wadin
- Designer: Andreas Wangler
- Composer: Retro Family
- Engine: Unity
- Platforms: Microsoft Windows, Mac OS
- Release: 28 August 2013
- Genre: Survival
- Mode: Single player

Shelter is a 2013 survival game developed by Might and Delight. In the game players control a mother badger who must protect and feed her cubs while travelling from their burrow to a new one. During the journey the cubs must be fed and are in danger from threats such as birds of prey and wildfires. It was released for Windows and Mac on 28 August 2013.

The game was received positively and got favorable reviews on the graphics and sound, as well as the emotional impact that it evoked. Reviewers gave mixed reactions to the difficulty and length.

== Gameplay ==
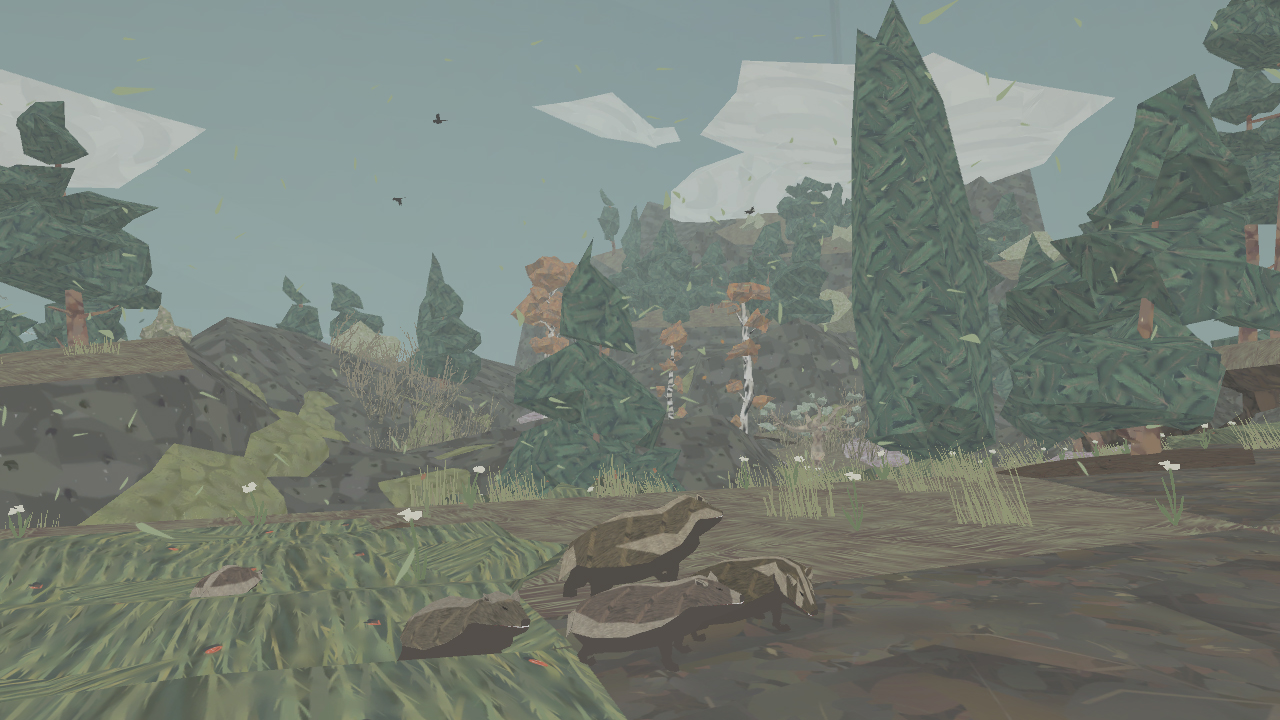
In Shelter the player controls a mother badger looking after her cubs

In Shelter, players control a mother badger who is escorting her five cubs from their burrow to a new home and must protect them from danger. Along the journey, the cubs will gradually get hungry and require food which the player must provide for them by either catching prey, such as foxes, or finding fruit and vegetables. Threats to the cubs come in different forms in each section of the game.

In the first and latter sections of the game, there are areas that contain circling birds of prey which can fly down and pick off a cub if it is out in the open for too long. One section of the game takes place at night, giving the player limited vision of their surroundings. In this section, cubs will occasionally be scared by noises and will run away from the player, requiring them to chase the cubs until they are within a safe radius of the mother. In a later section, the player must travel through a wildfire, keeping the cubs safe from the spreading blaze. Another requires the player to escort the cubs up an overflowing river. The goal of the game becomes to have as many cubs as possible and survive the journey to shelter.

== Development ==
Might and Delight began development on Shelter in January 2013 following the release of Pid. The game was announced and listed on Steam Greenlight in April, accepted in July, and released on 28 August of the same year. In December 2013 Might and Delight released a free add-on for Shelter in which the player must feed their cubs once a day for a month to keep them from dying. iOS and Android versions were released in February 2023.

== Reception ==
Reception

Aggregate scores
Aggregator	Score
GameRankings	68.79%
Metacritic	69/100

Review scores
Publication	Score
Edge	7/10
Eurogamer	8/10
GameSpot	7/10
Joystiq	2/5
Gamezebo	4/5
Hardcore Gamer	4/5
GameFront	70/100

Shelter received mostly positive reviews, scoring 68.79% and 69% on review aggregators GameRankings and Metacritic respectively. Reviewers praised the game for its emotion provoking nature, with the death of a cub "causing a genuine feeling of loss" for Ben Textor of Hardcore Gamer and the game's ending leaving Simon Parkin of Eurogamer "reeling with grief and bewilderment." In GameSpot's review Kevin VanOrd said that when a cub dies "there's a gnawing sense of failure, not as a game player, but as a parent with a duty to shield your young."

The game's art and audio were generally well received, with Edge describing the game as having "a beautiful, pastel-coloured patchwork" and John Walker commenting that the game was "ludicrously pretty" in Rock, Paper, Shotgun's positive review. GameFront's review was less favourable of the graphics, with Jerry Bonner describing them as having "a distinctly polygonal look, as if this game was developed for the original Playstation." Of the audio, Mike Rose of Gamezebo said it was "just immense, and matches the surroundings perfectly."

The lack of direction in the game was given mixed reception; Joystiq's JG Carter described the night time level as "ill-explained", and Edge said that the rules were "occasionally clunky [and] unclear." The length of the game was also criticised for being too short, with Mike Rose stating that he found the game "rather short" and Ben Textor saying the game was "somewhat pricey considering its runtime."

== Sequel ==
On 9 March 2015, a sequel titled Shelter 2 was released via the software client Steam. This game has the player controlling a pregnant female lynx. Players guide the lynx as she finds a den for her coming litter of kittens and raises them, teaching them to survive in the wilderness. Unlike its predecessor, Shelter 2 allows the player to name the kittens. Those that survive a playthrough can also be controlled by the player, carrying on as the next generation of the family tree.
