= MAG Interactive =

Swedish mobile game developer and publisher

- Company type: Subsidiary
- Industry: Video games
- Founded: 2010
- Founders: Daniel Hasselberg; Roger Skagervall; Kaj Nygren; Johan Persson; Fredrik Stenh; Anders Larsson
- Headquarters: Stockholm, Sweden
- Area served: Worldwide
- Key people: Daniel Hasselberg (CEO) Magnus Wiklander (CFO) Kaj Nygren (CTO)
- Products: QuizDuel, Wordzee, WordDomination, Ruzzle, WordBrain
- Number of employees: 114
- Parent: Mobile Access Group Sweden AB
- Website: maginteractive.com

MAG Interactive is a Swedish mobile game developer and publisher founded in 2010 by Daniel Hasselberg, Roger Skagervall, Kaj Nygren, Johan Persson, Fredrik Stenh and Anders Larsson. Best known for its debut word game Ruzzle, and quiz game QuizDuel, MAG Interactive focuses on the casual games market by developing and acquiring social and educational based games for iOS, Android.

== History ==
Founding

Before creating MAG interactive, founders Daniel Hasselberg and Kaj Nygren met in 1999 while working at an Ericsson research lab. Together with mutual friend Roger Skagervall, they created a small company called "Connect Things". From that company, the three entrepreneurs went on to create "Mobile Access Group Sweden AB" in 2003, which originally focused on music streaming platforms. With the addition of Anders Larsson, Frederik Stenh and Johan Persson, Mobile Access Group Sweden AB transitioned into app development consulting in 2008. Four years later in 2012, the now named MAG Interactive, released their first proprietary game onto the Swedish market . The word play based game was called "Rumble" and went on to be renamed "Ruzzle", it is the cornerstone of MAG's game line up. From that point on MAG acquired many other social game concepts, including "Word Brain" and QuizDuel.

Acquiring Delinquent

In 2015 MAG Interactive acquired UK-based development studio Delinquent, increasing their staff number to 50 people. Their first joint project was a free-to-play match-3 game, Potion Pop, which successfully received millions of downloads.

Acquiring FEO Media and IPO

In 2017, MAG Interactive underwent some structural changes as a company. The first being the October acquisition of Swedish game studio FEO Media, maker of QuizDuel. In addition to the acquisition, MAG Interactive became a publicly traded company on December 8, with its listing on NASDAQ First North.

Acquiring Sventertainment

In August 2020 MAG Interactive announced the acquisition of Swedish media company Sventertainment AB, maker of the live trivia app PrimeTime, for 20 million SEK.

Acquiring Apprope

In December 2020, MAG Interactive announced the acquisition of Swedish game studio Apprope through an initial cash purchase price of 50 million SEK. Founded in 2012 by Daniel Lodin and Markus Wedenborn, Apprope is a maker of casual mobile games for iOS & Android including titles such as WordBubbles and Word Mansion.

== Awards ==
Tech 5 2014 - Jury Prize

Hit Bolagen 2014 - #1

Deloitte Fast 50. 2015 - #7 Growth rate 929% between 2011 and 2014

Deloitte Fast 50 2016 - #17 Growth rate 688% between 2012 and 2015

Inc 5000 2017 - #914

== Games ==
In 2012 MAG Interactive published its first mobile game Ruzzle, other games created by MAG Interactive include Wordzee, Word Domination, New QuizDuel, PaintHit, WordBrain, WordBrain 2, PotionPop, Wordalot, Wordalot Express, QuizCross, and Ruzzle Adventure. Each game has a multi-million player base that collectively reached 350+ million downloads as of 2020.

=== List of Games Developed/Published by MAG Interactive ===
Game	Release date	Description
Ruzzle	2012	Similar to Boggle, players have two minutes to form as many words as possible with sixteen letters available in a 4x4 grid on the screen.
Quiz Cross	2012	A combination of Tic-Tac-Toe and trivia, it lets players challenge their Facebook friends or random opponents in a trivia duel in each players native language.
Word Brain	2013	A game based on classic Word Search, the players are tasked with finding one or several specific scrambled words on a puzzle grid and in a specific order.
Ruzzle Adventure	2014	Based on Ruzzle but presented it in a different way. The progression in the game is based on levels spanning through five worlds: The Forest, The Swamp, The Volcano, Area 42 and The Lost Island.
Potion Pop	2015	A match-3 swapping tile game where players swipe to swap adjacent potions in order to match three or more of the same color.
Word Brain 2	2016	A sequel to the word game Word Brain, this game differs from the original by adding a theme to each puzzle.
Wordalot	2016	A crossword puzzle type game, it hides clues to missing words in images placed above the crossword board.
Wordalot Express	2016	A quick version of Word-A-Lot without the option to change levels.
Backpacker	2017	A mobile travel quiz game, based on the 90's computer game Backpacker. Created by the games studio Qiiwi and published by MAG Interactive.
WordDomination	2018	A PvP mobile crossword game with collectable boosters that allows for additional strategic game play.
PaintHit	2018	Hyper casual mobile game where players shoot paint balls towards targets on spinning towers.
Wordzee	2019	Casual PvP word game, with game mechanics inspired by the classic dice game Yatzy.
New QuizDuel	2020	A sequel to the PvP trivia game QuizDuel, introduces the addition of the multiplayer "arena", and a live quiz mode.
Crozzle	2023	A PvP crossword game.
