= Pid (video game) =

2012 video game

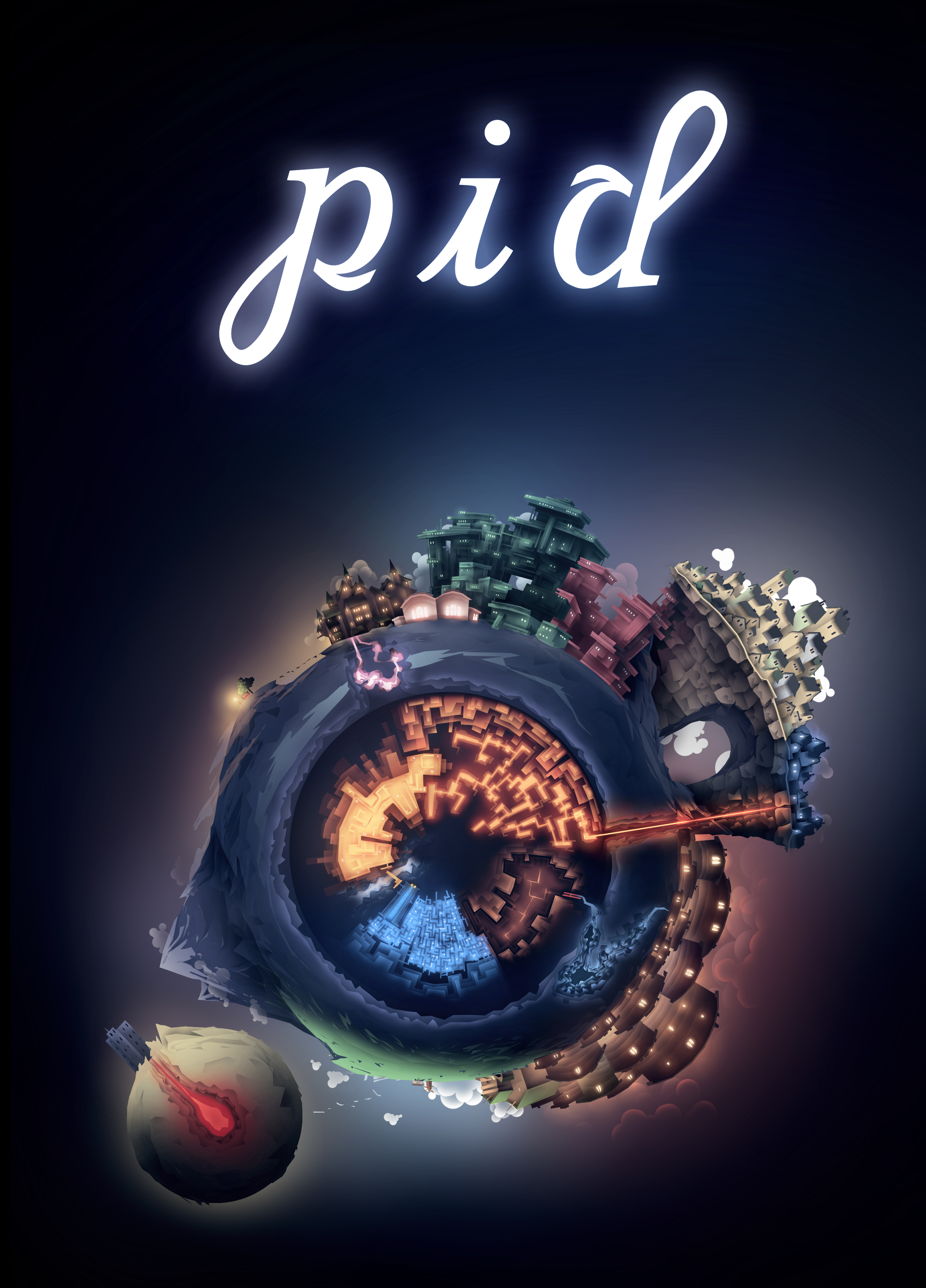
- Developer: Might and Delight
- Publishers: D3 Publisher; RedDeerGames (Switch)
- Composer: Retro Family
- Engine: Unity
- Platforms: OS X; Windows; Xbox 360 (XBLA); PlayStation 3 (PSN); Nintendo Switch
- Release: OS X, Windows, XBLA; October 31, 2012; PlayStation Network; November 6, 2012; Nintendo Switch; November 18, 2022
- Genre: Puzzle-platform
- Modes: Single-player, multiplayer

Pid is a puzzle-platform game developed by Might and Delight and published by D3 Publisher for Xbox 360 through the Xbox Live Arcade, PlayStation 3 through PlayStation Network, Microsoft Windows, and OS X. On November 18, 2022, it was published by RedDeerGames for Nintendo Switch. It was announced December 7, 2011, and released worldwide October 31, 2012.

The game received average scores, with reviewers citing its presentation and soundtrack as favorable, but having problems with the game's repetitive gameplay and frustrating puzzle solutions. Pid was the recipient of the 2012 European Games Award in the Innovate Newcomer category.

== Gameplay ==
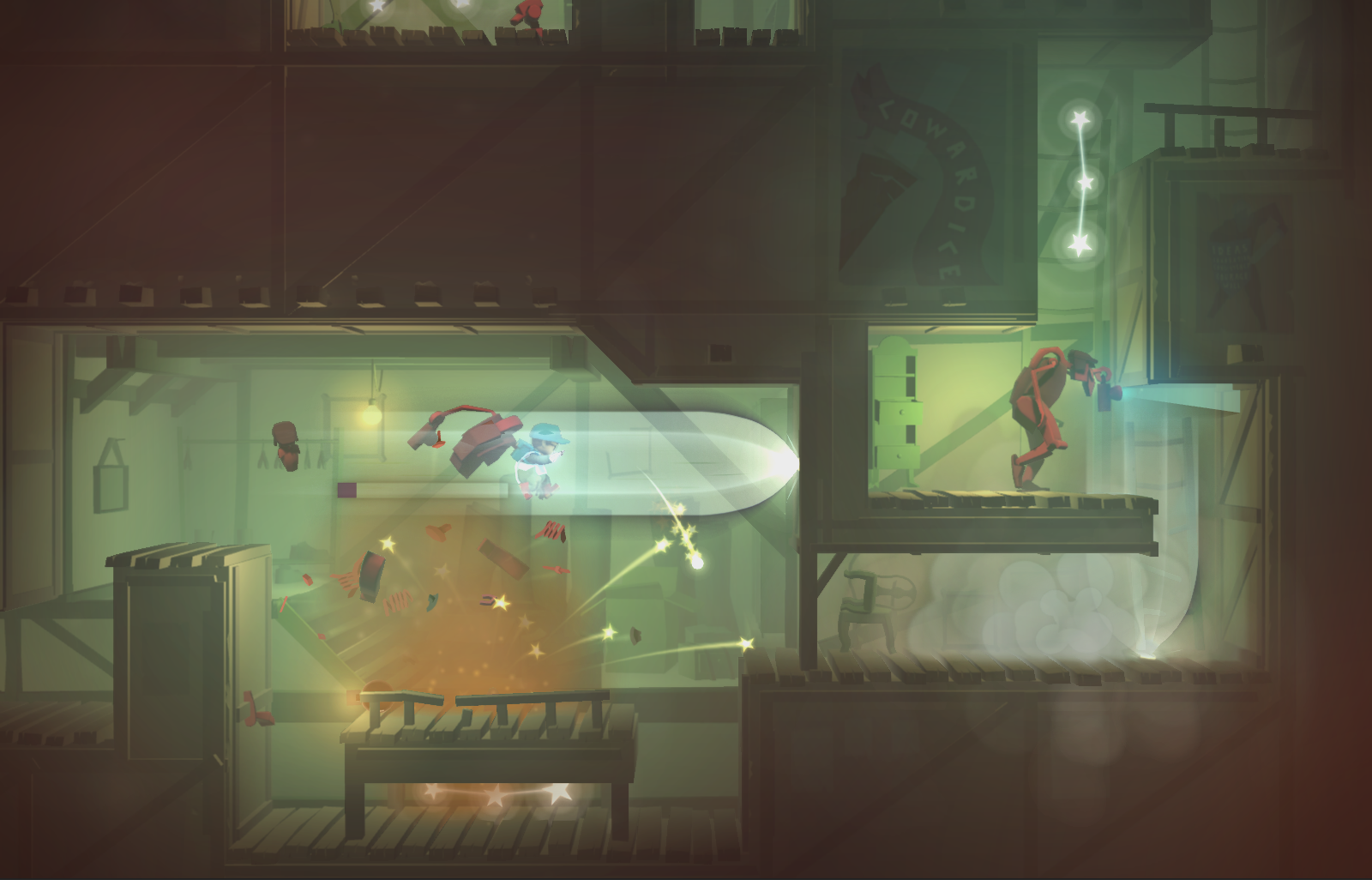
A screenshot of the game, in which the player rides a beam, having just destroyed an enemy on the Attic level.

Pid begins as a young boy named Kurt is left stranded on a remote alien planet. As he travels across the mysterious land, the boy must defeat terrifying robot enemies, as well as befriend unfamiliar allies in his quest to uncover an alien conspiracy and return home. The game takes place in a 2D side-scrolling perspective. The player must utilize a wide variety of different gameplay situations and mechanics to overcome and traverse the world's puzzle-like landscape. Kurt's primary tool is a white jewel that produces what the game calls "beams", which can be used to propel him in a manner of ways throughout the levels and solve various puzzles. The beams are used to create gravity wells, which push Kurt outward into the air, with two allowed to be active at once in the environment. However, gravity manipulation is not the only way to interact with his surroundings, as Kurt also comes across a variety of other tools which can be used at his disposal. Blue and red bombs can be detonated to either damage enemies immediately or timed for strategical placement respectively. Burst beams will allow him to reach higher areas out of reach from the normal beams' gravity wells. Smoke bombs can obscure his location from enemy spotlights and flashlights. Kurt may also make use of a vest that allows him to withstand more damage. There is also a co-operative mode where both players are dependent on each other to solve puzzles and eliminate enemies, while also competing and testing their skills against one another.

== Soundtrack ==
The music score was composed and recorded by a small group of studio musicians called Retro Family, based in Sweden. The soundtrack has notably been a large part of the game's praises.

== Reception ==
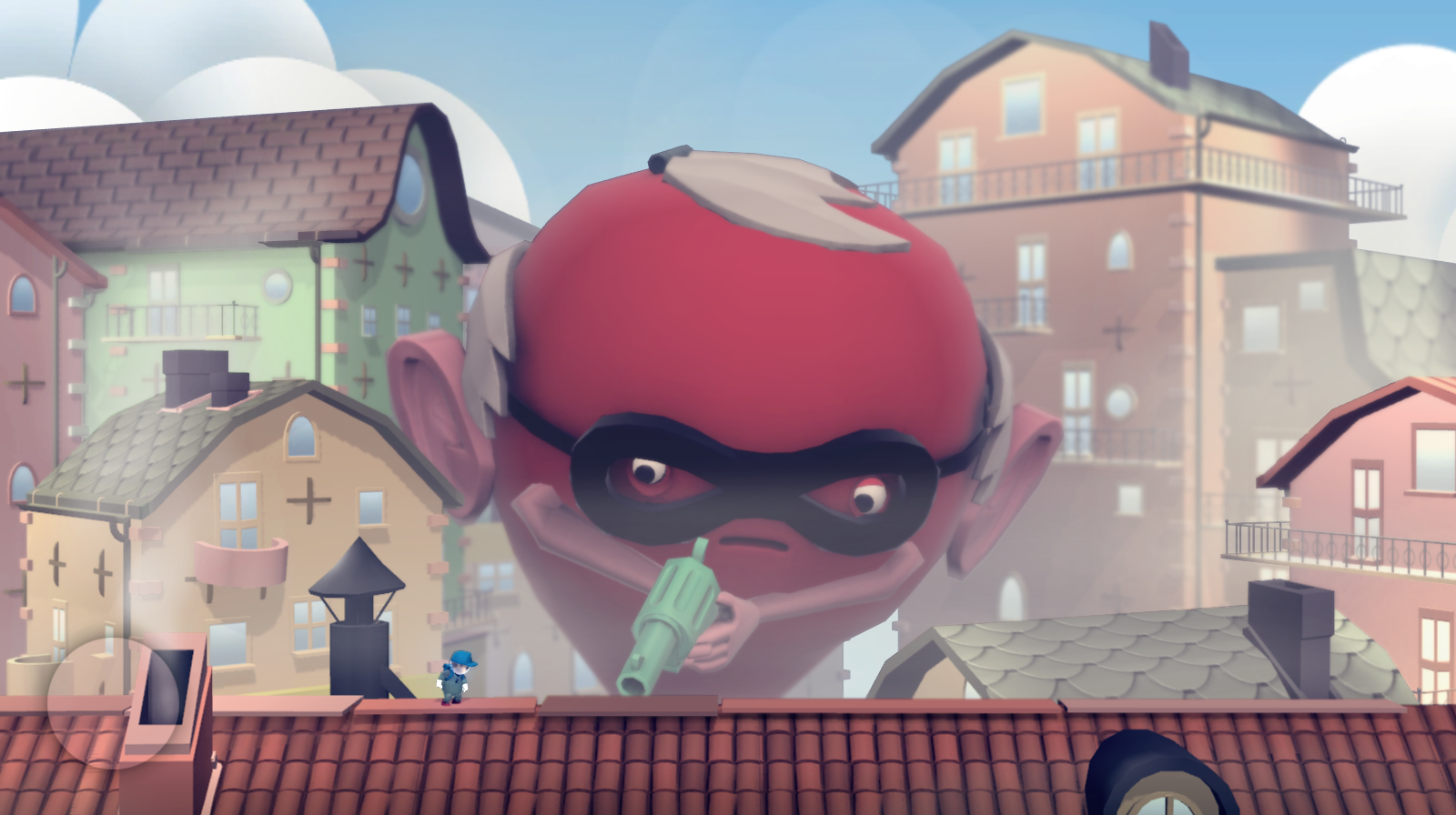
The player prepares to face The Crook, the city's boss.

Pid has received mixed reviews from critics, with a Metacritic and GameRankings average score of 72/100 and 73% respectively. Criticism was directed at the game's repetitiveness and difficulty. GameSpot's Leif Johnson criticized the game's "excessively brutal difficulty, particularly in boss fights", while also enjoying the gravity puzzles and presentation, giving the game a 7/10. IGN's Colin Moriarty gave Pid a 7.8/10, or a "good" score, also praising the game's unique gameplay and setting as well its soundtrack, while also stating "occasionally wonky puzzles are bound to annoy" and puzzle solutions may be frustratingly obtuse. Other reviewers were much more positive, with Official Xbox Magazine's Chuck Osborn giving the game an 8.5 for its innovative gravity mechanic allowing "for more freedom in puzzle solving".
