= Entropia Universe =

2003 video game

- Former logo
- Developer: MindArk
- Publisher: MindArk
- Designer: Multiple
- Engine: CryEngine 2
- Platform: Microsoft Windows
- Release: January 30, 2003
- Genres: Massively multiplayer online role-playing game, first-person shooter
- Mode: Online multiplayer

Entropia Universe is a massively multiplayer online (MMORPG) virtual universe designed by the Swedish software company MindArk, based in Gothenburg.

Entropia uses a micropayment business model, in which players may buy in-game currency (PED - Project Entropia Dollars) with real money that can be redeemed back into U.S. dollars at a fixed exchange rate of 10:1. This means that virtual items acquired within Entropia Universe have a real cash value, and a participant may, at any time, initiate a withdrawal of their accumulated PED back into U.S. dollars according to the fixed exchange rate, minus transaction fees. The Entropia Universe is a direct continuation of Project Entropia.

Entropia Universe entered the Guinness World Records Book in both 2004 and 2008 for the most expensive virtual world objects ever sold. In 2009, a virtual space station, a popular destination, sold for $330,000. This was then eclipsed in November 2010 when Jon Jacobs sold a club named "Club Neverdie" for $635,000; this property was sold in chunks, with the largest sold for $335,000. The game has been described as dedicated to capitalism rather than quality of gameplay, and connecting the in-game labor with real world profits, in which sense it can be seen as a spiritual precursor to the play to earn model.

== Gameplay ==
The game can be played for free, but spending money on the in-game currency allows significant additional options like purchasing items, skills, deeds/shares, and services from other players. Nearly all of the main in-game activities require expendable resources which must be purchased. Items can also be crafted for use or for sale to other players.

== Development ==
In 1995, development of Entropia Universe (formerly Project Entropia) was started by two different groups - one in Sweden headed by Jan Welter Timkrans and one in Switzerland, headed by Benny Iggland. Initially taking place on the fictional Planet Calypso, the 2001 version used the NetImmerse 4 game engine. On May 20, 2002, the Commercial Open Trial began, and the game was available to the public. With Version Update 4.2 on 28 January 2003, the game was considered "Gold".

In 2022, the developers of Entropia Universe began development work on the migration to Unreal Engine 5. The migration to Unreal Engine 5 will include the "evolution of core systems, such as hunting, mining and crafting" and the "migration of items and value currently present in Entropia Universe" ensuring that the game's economic and item-based systems are preserved and integrated into the updated game client.

== Significant events and virtual property sales ==
- December 14, 2004 – Game creators MindArk announced the conclusion of the first "Treasure Island Sale", a virtual island put up for auction. The winning bidder paid 265,000 PED (US$26,500) for the island, the highest price ever paid for a virtual item.
- October 24, 2005 – A virtual "asteroid space resort" was bought by Jon "Neverdie" Jacobs for a sum of 1,000,000 PED (US$100,000), surpassing the sale of Treasure Island.
- May 2, 2006 – MindArk announced the introduction of an ATM card enabling players to withdraw the real-world currency equivalent of their PED funds directly from any Versatel ATM. It was stated that $165 million had "passed through the game" in 2005 and that this figure was expected to double in 2006.
- October 17, 2006 – MindArk announced that Entropia Universe had reached 500,000 registered users.
- May 8, 2007 – MindArk announced the results of a "virtual banking license auction". These two-year exclusive licenses aimed to integrate real world banking systems into Entropia Universe, working similarly to real-world banks or pawn shops. Initially, they would be provided with secure systems enabling them to lend money and collect interest, design and name their own virtual bank building(s), and make their own personnel available through avatars. Each winner would be required to add a further US$100,000 as working capital. After months of bidding, the six licenses sold for a total of US$404,000.

== Media ==
=== Entropia Universe - Fan magazine ===
The Gate
2002	The Gate #1, October 2002	The Gate #2, November 2002	The Gate #3, December 2002	
2003	The Gate#4, February 2003	The Gate #5, March 2003	The Gate #6, April 2003	The Gate #7, May 2003

The Calypso Independence
2005	The Calypso Independence 1, September 2005	The Calypso Independence 2, November 2005	The Calypso Independence 3, December 2005
2006	The Calypso Independence 4, January 2006	The Calypso May 5, September 2006	The Calypso August 6, September 2006
