= Word Brain =

2015 video game

WordBrain
- Developer(s): MAG Interactive
- Platform(s): iOS, Android, Windows Phone 8
- Release: July 19, 2015
- Genre(s): Word game

WordBrain is a word game acquired by Swedish game developer MAG Interactive and released through them on July 19, 2015 for iOS, Android and Windows phone platforms.

== Gameplay ==
The gameplay mechanic is based on finding one or several specific words on a puzzle grid and swiping over the scrambled letters to see words collapse.

The 1980 levels available are grouped in packs of 20, starting with a grid size of 2x2 and reaching 8x8 in the later packs. Players progress in the game by completing packs and unlocking more challenging levels.

== Reception ==
WordBrain had over 40 million downloads as of 2020.
