= G5 Entertainment =

Swedish video game company

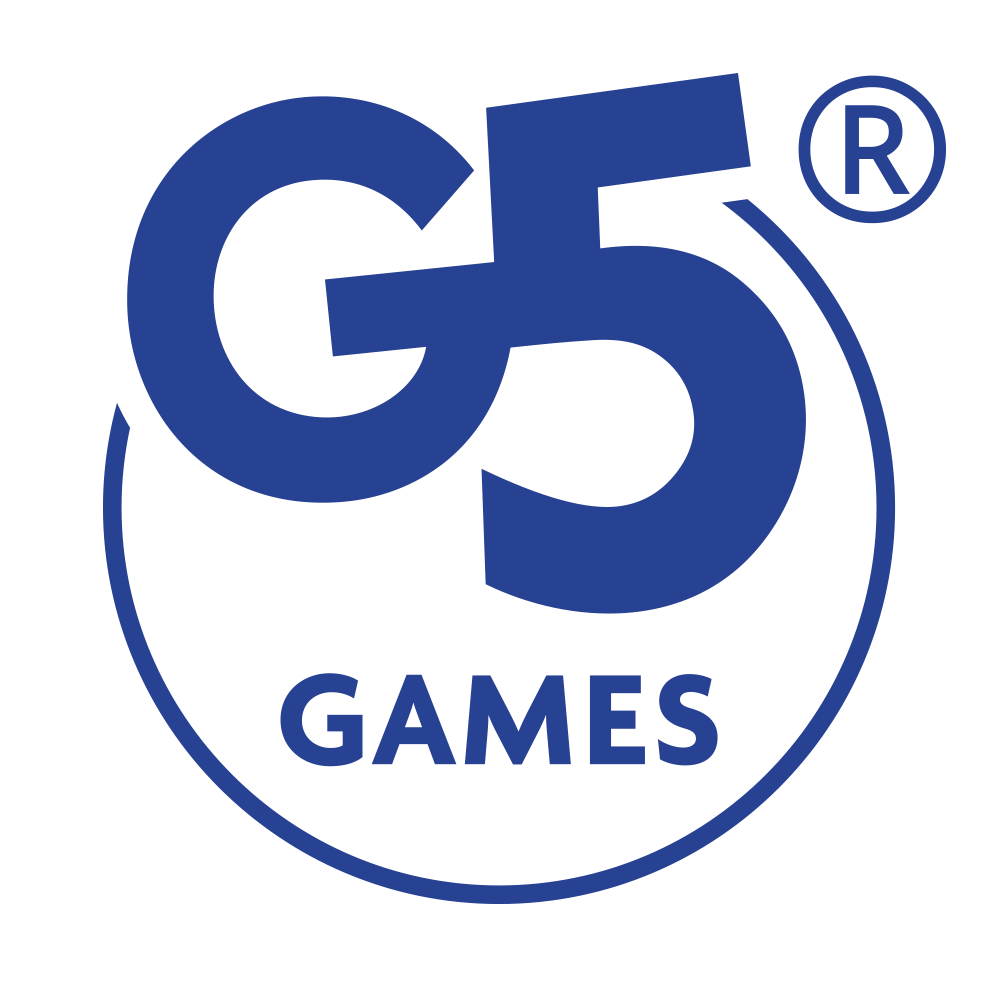
- Type: Public
- Traded as: Nasdaq Nordic: G5EN; OTCQX: GENTF
- Industry: Video games
- Founded: 2001; 25 years ago
- Headquarters: Stockholm, Sweden
- Key people: Vlad Suglobov (CEO); Alexander Tabunov (COO)
- Website: g5.com

G5 Entertainment is a Swedish video game developer that produces free-to-play mobile games.

== History ==
G5 Entertainment was founded by Aleksandr Tabunov, Sergey Shults and Vlad Suglobov. In 2006, the company went public on the Nasdaq Nordic exchange under the ticker G5EN. In 2021, the company had grown significantly since it was founded.

In 2006, the group started developing PC games and then went on to release mobile games such as Supermarket Mania and Virtual City. The games were later launched on the Apple App Store. Developed by the company, Mahjong Artifacts, was eventually adapted into a free game called Mahjong Journey.

In 2024 and 2025, G5 Entertainment was included in the Europe’s Long-Term Growth Champions ranking in Financial Times reports.

== Games ==
G5 is primarily active in the mobile games market. In 2011, G5 released Virtual City Playground, their first game with freemium monetization.

As of 2018, their title Hidden City was responsible for most of their revenue, and represented a majority of the market share for hidden object games. However, later that year, analyst Daniel Zetterberg reported that the game's revenue had passed its peak. After Hidden City, which had been licensed from another developer, G5 focused more on their own game development.

Games published by G5 Entertainment include: Sherlock, Jewels of Egypt, Jewels of the Wild West, Hidden City, Jewels of Rome, Mahjong Journey and The Secret Society.
