= The Drilling Company =

The Drilling Company is a New York based theatrical home for professional actors, playwrights, directors and other practitioners bringing obscure pieces to recognition in the community through developing, discovering or re-imagining its pieces. It can be categorized as Off-Off-Broadway. Under the producing artistic direction of Hamilton Clancy, the company has produced Shakespeare in the Parking Lot, Bryant Park Shakespeare and the Off Broadway original production of "The Norwegians". The Drilling Company was founded in 1999 by Hamilton Clancy, Lizabeth Allen and Ross Stoner. It is located in Manhattan. In the summer of 2014 the Drilling Company provided a free performance of Hamlet in Bryant Park.

== Shakespeare in the Parking Lot ==
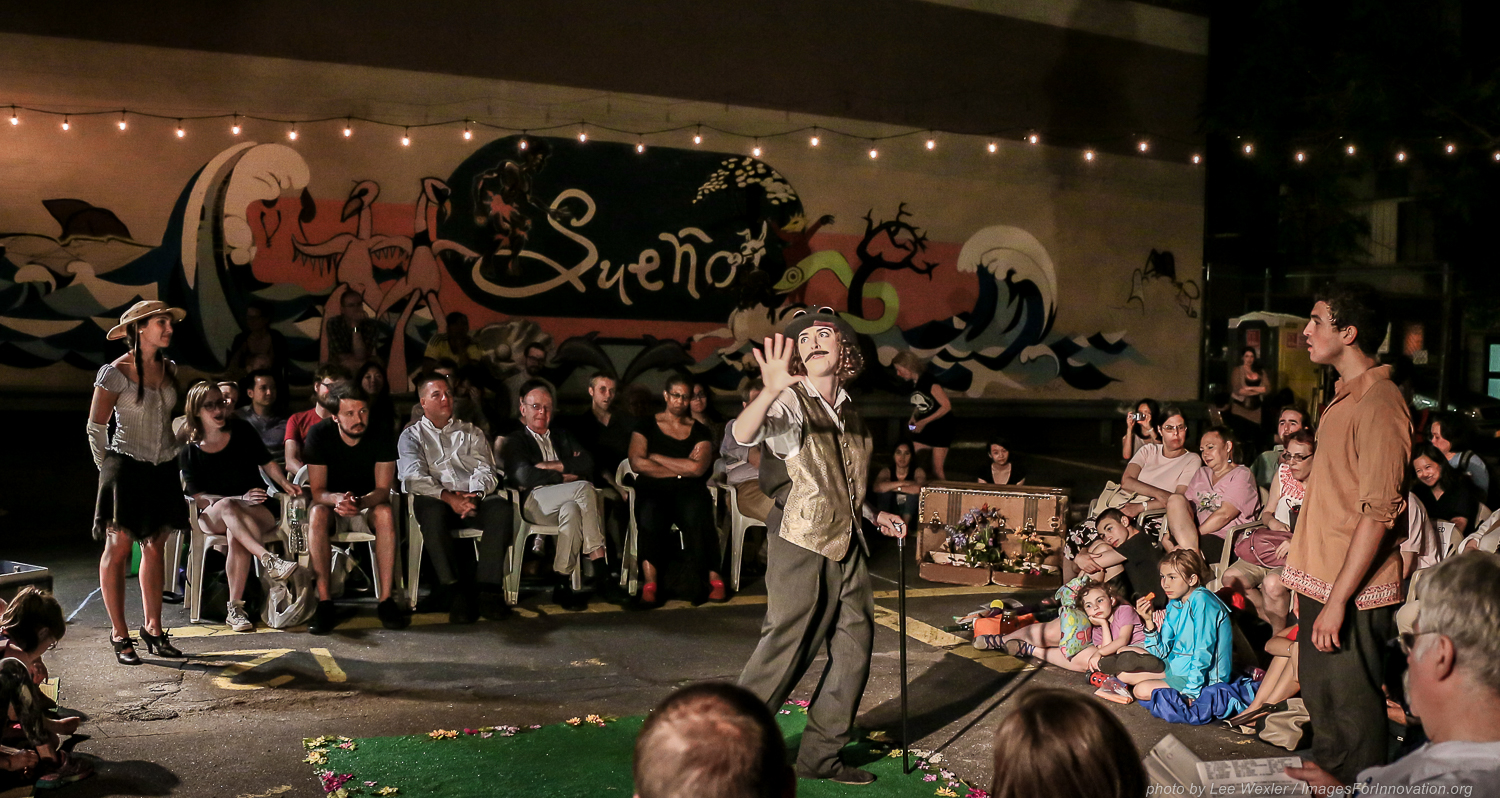
Summer of 2015 Shakespeare in the Parking Lot production of As You Like It at the Clemente Soto Vélez Cultural and Educational Center.

Shakespeare in the Parking Lot offers free summer Shakespeare productions in New York City. It utilizes a parking lot venue that makes classical theatre accessible to both theatre patrons and urban passersby. Audiences often bring blankets, lawns chairs and picnic baskets, although others may simply drop in after hearing actors shouting in verse. It was originally produced by Expanded Arts under the direction of Jennifer Spahr through her retirement in 2000. From 2001 to 2005, The Drilling Company began co-producing the productions with an organization formed by Leonard McKenzie, Ludlow Ten. In 2006, the tradition continued under the sole production of The Drilling Company. The parking lot productions began in 1995 on the Lower East Side of Manhattan with a production of Midsummer-Night's Dream in a municipal parking lot on the corner of Ludlow and Broome Street. After losing the space in 2014, the company began a search for a new venue. They eventually moved to another space three blocks from the original space in the parking lot behind Clemente Soto Velez Cultural and Educational Center, 114 Norfolk located on the east side of Norfolk Street between Delancey and Rivington Streets.
