= Chapter 2 (House of Cards) =

- House of Cards episode
- Episode no.: Season 1 Episode 2
- Directed by: David Fincher
- Written by: Beau Willimon
- Cinematography by: Eigil Bryld
- Editing by: Kirk Baxter
- Production code: HOC-102
- Original release date: February 1, 2013
- Running time: 49 minutes

Episode chronology
← Previous "Chapter 1"	Next → "Chapter 3"
- House of Cards (season 1)

"Chapter 2" is the second episode of the first season of the American political thriller drama series House of Cards. Written by series creator Beau Willimon and directed by David Fincher, the episode premiered on February 1, 2013, when it was released along with the rest of the first season on the American streaming service Netflix.

== Plot ==
Frank (Kevin Spacey) meets with members of the Democratic leadership to discuss their course of action on how to handle the poorly-received education bill. They are interrupted by Remy Danton (Mahershala Ali), a former press secretary-turned-corporate lobbyist, who reminds Frank that his main client, SanCorp, has heavily invested in him. Meanwhile, Doug (Michael Kelly) finds something on Senator Michael Kern (Kevin Kilner), President Walker's nominee for Secretary of State, but Frank refuses to use it. After leaking the draft of the education bill, Frank secures control of the legislation and lures Blythe (Reed Birney) into becoming his scapegoat. Claire (Robin Wright) continues downsizing her staff at the Clean Water Initiative.

Frank arranges a meeting with Zoe (Kate Mara) and hands her an editorial from a student newspaper in which Kern had denounced the Israeli occupation of the West Bank as illegal. Despite reservations, Zoe and her editors decide to publish. During an interview with George Stephanopoulos, Kern is confronted with an advance copy of Zoe's article. Furthermore, Stamper manages to locate Roy Kapeniak (T.J. Edwards), Kern's former co-editor of the student newspaper. Frank decides to send Russo (Corey Stoll) to talk with Kapeniak, who reveals that it was actually his article, not Kern's; Russo asks him to lie about it and say that Kern wrote it. Barnes runs the story linking Kern to the editorial, ending his nomination. With everything already planned, Frank contacts Durant (Jayne Atkinson) and has Barnes leak her name as Kern's replacement in order to fuel early media speculation. Durant leads the polls and thus wins Vazquez's and Walker's support. Frank provides subtle affirmation of the choice.

== Cast ==
=== Main ===
- Kevin Spacey as U.S. Representative Francis J. Underwood
- Robin Wright as Claire Underwood, Francis' wife
- Kate Mara as Zoe Barnes, reporter at The Washington Herald
- Corey Stoll as U.S. Representative Peter Russo
- Michael Kelly as Doug Stamper, Underwood's Chief of Staff
- Sakina Jaffrey as Linda Vasquez, White House Chief of Staff
- Kristen Connolly as Christina Gallagher, a congressional staffer
- Constance Zimmer as Janine Skorsky, reporter
- Sebastian Arcelus as Lucas Goodwin, editor and reporter at The Washington Herald
- Boris McGiver as Tom Hammerschmidt, editor-in-chief for The Washington Herald

=== Recurring ===
- Elizabeth Norment as Nancy Kaufberger
- Mahershala Ali as Remy Danton
- Rachel Brosnahan as Rachel Posner
- Reg E. Cathey as Freddy Hayes
- Kevin Kilner as Michael Kern
- Jayne Atkinson as Catherine Durant
- Francie Swift as Felicity Holburn
- Chance Kelly as Steve
- Reed Birney as Donald Blythe
- Maryann Plunkett as Evelyn
- Chuck Cooper as Barney Hull
- Michael Siberry as David Rasmussen

=== Guests ===
- Morrie Kraemer as Dennis Mendel
- TJ Edwards as Roy Kapeniak

== Reception ==
The episode received positive reviews from critics. Boston Globe's Matthew Gilbert noted that "the first two episodes were expertly directed by David Fincher" and Spacey's harmonious cadence such as those used in the first scene of this episode "makes even his character's mercy killing of an injured dog—which he does by hand—seem a little less brutal." Ryan McGee of The A.V. Club said, "No actor, even one as skilled and charismatic as Spacey, can maintain interest with stakes this low over the long haul. For House of Cards to move to the next level, things have to stop being easy. They have to start getting hard. If the show does that, what's merely good right now should leap into the level of greatness."

== Notes ==
- This article incorporates material derived from the "Chapter 2" article on the House of Cards wiki at Fandom (formerly Wikia) and is licensed under the Creative Commons Attribution-Share Alike 3.0 License (5 September 2016).
