= Ruzzle =

2012 video game

- Developer: MAG Interactive
- Platforms: iOS, Android, Windows Phone 8
- Release: March 2012
- Genre: Word Game

Ruzzle is a mobile game developed by Swedish gaming company MAG Interactive and was first published in the Apple Store in March 2012. Ruzzle is inspired by the classic board games Boggle and Scrabble. The game is highly social and based on online matches, requiring the player to find an opponent who can be appointed randomly by the system from online users, chosen from a list of friends set by the player, or selected from amongst their Facebook friends. Ruzzle is now available for iOS, Android, and Windows Phones.

== Gameplay ==
The game is based on a system of online challenges: to start a game, the player must find an opponent to play against, which may be chosen randomly by the system between online users, chosen from a list of friends set by the player or chosen among Facebook friends.

Each game is divided into three rounds and the final score is the sum of the scores obtained in each round. In each round, the player has two minutes to form as many words as possible with the sixteen letters available in the 4x4 grid on the screen. Words must be at least two letters and must be formed using letters adjacent one to another. You can not enter the same letter-box multiple times within the same word. As in Scrabble, a different score is assigned to each letter.

After each round, in the paid version, you can view all the possible words and see if you managed to find any of the highest-scoring possible words. You also get to compare your words with that of an opponent (if you had one—there is a practice mode that allows you to play against no one). In round 3, the tiles generally have more score boosters such as Doubling or Tripling the value of letters or even entire words; therefore, round 3 scores of experienced players can often be above 2,000 while round 1 and 2 scores are generally less than half. The free version has the multiplayer functionality of the premium version, but lacks the "view all possible words" feature and also has advertisements.

== Reception ==
The game success was initially confined to its domestic market in Sweden, and in nearby countries like Denmark, Norway and the Netherlands. In January 2013, six months after the original release, Ruzzle topped the list of most downloaded app in the United States and as of April 2013 counts more than 35 million players in 128 different countries.

== Ruzzle Adventure ==
MAG Interactive released Ruzzle Adventure May 2014 on IOS systems. The progression in the game is based on new word challenges with goals and move limits as you advance to each level of the game. The levels span through five worlds: The Forest, The Swamp, The Volcano, Area 42, and The Lost Island.
