= Knytt =

2006 video game

- The artwork for the 2026 rerelease Knytt Classic
- Developer: Nifflas
- Publisher: Nifflas
- Series: Knytt
- Platform: Windows
- Release: 10 December 2006
- Genre: Platformer
- Mode: Single-player

Knytt is a 2006 indie platform video game developed and published by Nifflas. It was released as freeware for Microsoft Windows. The game's protagonist, also called Knytt, is abducted from his home planet by an alien, and subsequently crash-lands on a different world. He must search for missing parts to repair the ship so that he can leave the planet. The game was positively received by critics. It was followed up by two sequels, Knytt Stories and Knytt Underground. On August 10, 2026, a free re-release for modern machines with new difficulty modes and achievements, called Knytt Classic, was released on Steam for the game's 20th anniversary.

== Gameplay ==
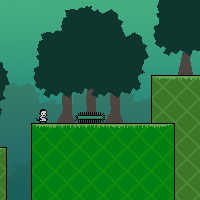
Gameplay screenshot depicting the player character (left)

The game consists purely of exploration, without combat, switches, or puzzles. The player must control Knytt to find 11 lost components for the spacecraft. Wall-climbing is its primary traversal mechanic.

Knytt has been described as a minimalist platformer by its creator.

== Development ==
Nifflas started working on Knytt as a side project during development on Within a Deep Forest 2, which he later abandoned in favor of focusing on Knytt.

Though Knytt's primary developer was Nifflas, the game was a collaborative effort between him and "the help of a passionate group of internet forum collaborators."

The Knytt character was designed by Nifflas' ex-girlfriend, who named it after the character Knyttet (Toffle) from the book Who Will Comfort Toffle? by Tove Jansson.

== Reception ==
Edge called Knytt their "Internet Game of the Month", describing it as a "sprawling 2D wonderland" with "curiously charismatic creatures". They said that the gameplay was "pure platforming pleasure" with a "wonderfully soothing soundscape", and that they could not think of a reason to put off playing it. Hardcore Gamer also praised the game and its lack of combat, calling it "relaxed" and "low-key". The publication described Knytt as a "great change of pace". PC Zone stated that the game was "overflowing with content", saying that while it was a "basic platformer", its world was "beautifully stylized". Calling it a "must-play", the publication said that most of the joy comes from exploring its "vast" world.
