= MindArk =

Swedish video game company

MindArk is a Swedish software company located in Gothenburg. It created Entropia Universe (formerly known as Project Entropia), a popular MMORPG-style online virtual universe. In this Real Cash Economy metaverse there are (as of 2021) six planet partners, which manage the virtual planets Calypso, Rocktropia, Next Island, Arkadia, Cyrene and Toulan. Some of the company's senior managers saw potential in Project Entropia and bought the operation back from the receiver in April 2003. Many employees also chose to follow suit and the company Mindark PE AB was formed.

In 2021, MindArk started working on the next generation Entropia Universe experience based on the Graphics Engine Unreal Engine 5 from Epic Games.
