= Might and Delight =

Swedish video game developer

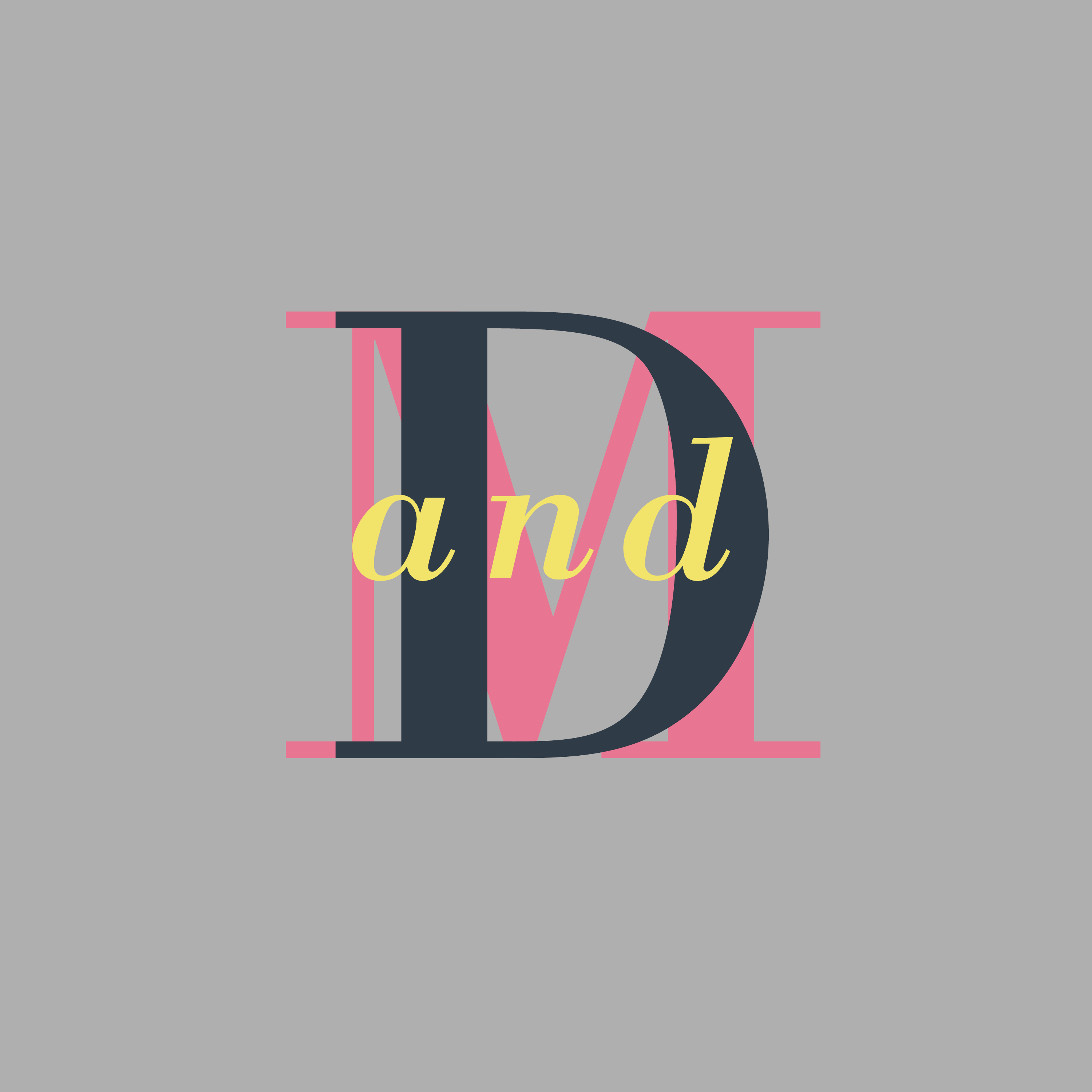
- Industry: Video games
- Founded: 2010; 16 years ago
- Headquarters: Stockholm, Sweden
- Key people: Anders Westin (CEO)
- Website: mightanddelight.com

Might and Delight is a Swedish video game development studio and publisher based in Stockholm. The studio was established in 2010 and is best known for the Shelter series.

== History ==
Might and Delight formed in 2010, comprising a team of 11, who had previously worked at Grin on Bionic Commando Rearmed. The team's initial goal was to create simple games that provided "something fresh and accessible". When the studio formed and began work on its first game, Pid, the development team was very enthusiastic to create a good game, and entered a long period of crunch, with some developers working 14–17 hours per day. Looking back at this period, CEO Anders Westin said "Ambition is dangerous, we shouldn't have let them do that". For the studio's next project, Shelter, the team ensured they didn't increase the scope of the game too far, and didn't encourage overtime.

In 2015 the studio announced that it would also begin publishing games, focusing on games with distinctive art styles and strong themes.

== Games ==
Title	Year	Platforms
Pid	2012	Xbox Live Arcade, Nintendo Switch, PlayStation 3, Microsoft Windows, Mac OS X
Shelter	2013	Microsoft Windows, OS X
The Blue Flamingo	2014	Microsoft Windows
Shelter 2	2015	Microsoft Windows, OS X, Linux
Paws	2016	Microsoft Windows, OS X, Linux
Meadow	2016	Microsoft Windows, OS X, Linux
Tiny Echo	2017	Microsoft Windows, OS X, Linux
Shelter 3	2021	Microsoft Windows, OS X, Linux
Book of Travels (early access, cancelled)	2021	Microsoft Windows, OS X, Linux
Twinkleby	2025	Microsoft Windows, OS X, Linux

Shelter 2 and Paws were additionally released for the Nintendo Switch in a bundle titled Shelter Generations. In 2015 Might and Delight announced Child of Cooper, a surreal exploration game - it was cancelled three months before its release the same year as a result of low interest in the game. For the early access multiplayer game Book of Travels, Might and Delight ran a successful Kickstarter campaign in 2019 to fund development. In 2021, following the disappointing early access launch of Book of Travels, the studio laid off around 25 staff, reducing their total headcount to 10.

In addition to games developed by Might and Delight, the studio also published Pan-Pan, developed by Spelkraft, in 2016.

In 2024, further layoffs were announced from the studio. The developer expressed their regret at being unable to continue focus on developing Book of Travels, while also announcing an upcoming 2025 game.
