= Within a Deep Forest =

2006 video game

- Developer: Nifflas
- Publisher: Nifflas
- Platform: Windows
- Release: 2006
- Genre: Platformer
- Mode: Single-player

Within a Deep Forest is a platformer developed and published by Nifflas. It was released as freeware in 2006 for Windows, and is a spiritual sequel to his previous games, #Modarchive Story and #Modarchive Story 2. The main character is an intelligent ball that is trying to stop the mad scientist Dr. Cliché from destroying the world. The game was praised by critics for its gameplay, as well as its minimalist graphics and sound.

== Gameplay ==
The player takes control of a bouncing ball known as the "Blue Ball" that can transform into various different ball types, which are obtained throughout the game. This includes the Glass Ball, which is immune to lasers but can break if impacting a surface too quickly, and the Pathetic Ball, which has diminished abilities.

== Plot ==
The evil Dr. Cliché created two bombs in order to permanently freeze the world, though the first failed and created a ball-like being, that endeavors to stop the second from being detonated.

== Reception ==
Retro Gamer criticized the game's story as "schlock", but described its gameplay as "fun", calling the game in general "atmospheric, eerie, and sometimes very challenging". The publication noted the high amount of effort put into the game, comparing it to retro games such as Cauldron II (1986). Andrew Gray of PC PowerPlay praised the game as an "excellent freeware action-adventure", due to its "beautiful" music and atmosphere, although felt the game's difficulty would case "much frustration". Retro Maniac called the game one of Nifflas' best works, praising the game's controls. James Murff of Big Download called it a rare art game that also contained engaging gameplay, and a "classic that manages to be both incredibly hard and very affecting at the same time". Commenting on the game's high difficulty, he noted that the game was proof that "you don't need to mangle games to create art: great, emotion-invoking games were there all along". Jan Tomášik of IDNES.cz rated the game highly, describing the difficulty as challenging but perfectly balanced. He also noted that the game had "great" graphics and music that established an "indescribable" atmosphere.
