= Nifflas =

Independent Swedish video game developer

Nicklas Nygren (born 6 January 1983), better known as Nifflas, is an independent Swedish video game developer. He is known for his freeware Knytt game series along with another freeware game, Within a Deep Forest. He has lived in Umeå, Sweden, and Copenhagen, Denmark.

== Ludography ==
=== Within a Deep Forest (2006) ===
Within a Deep Forest is a freeware game, taking place in the year 2500, after a devastating war has left the Earth a desolate wasteland. One of the survivors, the infamous and notorious Dr. Cliché, creates a time machine that enables him to travel many hundreds of years back in time in order to complete his most dastardly deed, the building of an underwater laboratory in which he has placed the most powerful bomb the world has yet known. As the game starts, the bomb has been activated, and the world lies in grave danger.

The bomb is in fact Dr. Cliché's second attempt as "his first attempt failed and instead lead to the creation of a ball, although, no ordinary ball." The player controls this ball throughout the game. It can be transformed into different materials, giving different abilities that advance gameplay.

Bigdownload.com highlighted Nygren's minimalist sound and graphics in Within A Deep Forest, and praised its sense of frustration and emotion.

=== Knytt series ===
==== Knytt ====
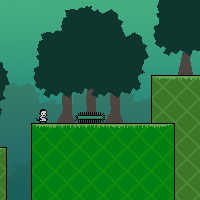
Knytt

The name Knytt [ˈknʏtː], which roughly translates as "tiny creature" from Swedish, comes from a character in the book Vem ska trösta Knyttet? by renowned Finnish-Swedish children's author Tove Jansson.

A peculiar creature living on a unique planet, the Knytt is abducted by an alien in a spaceship for no apparent reason and taken into outer space. While the alien is traveling through space, the spaceship is hit by a meteoroid and crashes onto another planet. The Knytt and the alien who has abducted it survive, but the spaceship is so heavily damaged that they are trapped on this new world. It is up to the Knytt to venture courageously through the various types of terrain and caves on this planet to retrieve the pieces of spaceship so that it can return to its home.

==== Knytt Stories (2007) ====
Knytt Stories is a follow-up to Knytt, and is mostly a level designer rather than a single campaign. It came packaged with several small levels. It features Juni, a character who shows up commonly in Knytt myths and stories. In the game, the player acts out these stories (also called levels or worlds) as Juni. The two stories that come bundled with the game, "Tutorial – Learn How to Play Knytt Stories" and "The Machine – A Save-the-World Adventure," are fairly short, but the game comes with a full level editor and support for many extra levels in game, loaded from .knytt.bin files. This format is meant to allow for easy access to new stories designed by Nygren as well as to encourage community development of expansion packs and third party stories. Nygren released two official expansion packs. The Multimedia Fusion and Nintendo DS source code for Knytt Stories and several other games was made available to public under a restrictive license, resulting in some mods but due to the closed source Multimedia Fusion game engine no source ports. In 2010, based on the source code and with support of Nifflas, a remake of this game was created in the C programming language, which resulted in a port to Nintendo DS.

==== Knytt Underground (2012) ====
Knytt Underground combines the features of Knytt and Within a Deep Forest and was released on PC, Mac and Linux platforms in late 2012, with the PlayStation platforms seeing the first launch. In July 2012, Nifflas announced that he was working on Knytt Underground, and that it is his biggest game yet. It was released on the PlayStation Network for PlayStation 3 and PS Vita in late December 2012, and the console versions include extra content. The game was released on Steam on 25 October 2013. A Wii U version of the game was confirmed in August 2013, and is being ported by Nygren's colleague Mathias Kærlev. The game was released on 19 December 2013 in both North America and Europe.

=== Saira ===
Saira is a 2D puzzle platformer. First announced during the final stages of work on NightSky, the game was initially known as Project Q. It was released on 12 December 2009. The eponymous Saira is a photographer who, as a result of a mysterious accident, found herself as the only remaining person in the entire galaxy and has to find out what happened. Saira features six endings and a unique graphical style that combines traditional 2D animation with high resolution photographs taken by Nygren—the press-release stated that the game was "developed almost as much in the outdoors as indoors". A level editor was included with the game.

=== FiNCK ===
In May 2010 Nygren released FiNCK ("Fire Nuclear Crocodile Killer"), a 2D puzzle platformer inspired by Super Mario Bros. 2 and the indie game Lyle in Cube Sector. The game, together with a level editor, is available as a free download; however, custom level support must be purchased.

=== NightSky ===
NightSky, a physics-based puzzle platformer, was released on 6 January 2011. The game had a long development history; first announced in 2007, it was known variously as Skymning and Night Game. On 5 May 2008, Nygren released three minigames that were going to be part of the project, but were abandoned due to incompatibilities with the new engine. In 2009, news appeared that the game would only be released for Wii, only in late 2010 it was announced that the PC version would appear first and was released on the Steam digital download service on 1 March 2011. The Wii version was eventually cancelled but later arrived on the Nintendo 3DS in 2012.

In NightSky, the player controls a glowing sphere which can accelerate and decelerate, and sometimes has the ability to invert gravity. The goal is to guide the sphere through 10 different worlds, each divided into 13 three-screen sections, each section containing a challenge or a puzzle. The soundtrack was composed and performed by Chris Schlarb; the game was produced by Nicalis.

=== Affordable Space Adventures (2015) ===
Affordable Space Adventures, a 2D puzzle adventure game for the Wii U, was released on 9 April 2015 in collaboration with Danish developer KnapNok Games. The game takes full advantage of the Wii U GamePad by allowing players to control a complex fictional spaceship via the touch-screen, switching between different engines and adjusting the ship's settings and landing gears to advance through the various levels' obstacles.

=== Uurnog (2017) ===
Uurnog, a 2D puzzle platformer with algorithmic music, was released on 3 March 2017 through the March 2017 Humble Monthly Bundle as a Humble Original title.

An expanded version titled Uurnog Uurnlimited, published by Raw Fury, was released on 17 November 2017 on Steam and on 21 November 2017 for the Nintendo Switch.

=== Ynglet (2021) ===
Ynglet, described as a floating non-platformer, was released on 5 June 2021 on Steam and published by Triple Topping Games. The game features a unique take on the concept of platformers, being top-down, as well as a dynamic soundtrack created using custom music software designed specifically for the game.

=== Other games ===
- Car Game – a mini game created by Nygren for a game-design one hour competition
- Bagatelle – a mini game originally created by Nygren for inclusion in Night Game as an unlockable.
- Cannon – a mini game originally created by Nygren for inclusion in Night Game as an unlockable.
- ClickDrop – a mini game originally created by Nygren for inclusion in Night Game as an unlockable.
- Det Officiella EDGE Dataspelet – a mini game programmed by Nygren for EDGE festivalen.
- Avoid the Evil Space Eel – a rhythm mini game created by Nygren for the No More Sweden competition.
- The Mushroom Engine – an updated version created by Nygren of an earlier game by another author, Jump on Mushrooms: The Game
- R-Type 3.141592653589793238469 – a mini game created by Nygren for the No More Sweden 2009 competition.
- The Great Work – a platformer made for a documentary film by Bautafilm.

Nygren has also been credited on the following games:

- Floating Islands Game – a puzzle game similar to Lemmings
- Baba is You – Nygren authored the levels Castle Disaster and Baba Has Keke.

With Nicalis, Inc. Nygren has also contributed to the enhanced soundtrack of the WiiWare version of the independent game, Cave Story.

== Discography ==
Apart from contributions to the original scores for eight of the games he has made, Nygren has also created seven stand-alone albums of ambient music. He is influenced by jazz.

Nygren's earlier works were primarily composed using Fast Tracker 2; however, his later works often use non-computer hardware and algorithmic composition generated using Ondskan, his self-created music software.

He was also featured on the song "Fifflas" on C418's album "one."
