= Mark Kassen =

American actor, director, and producer (born 1971)

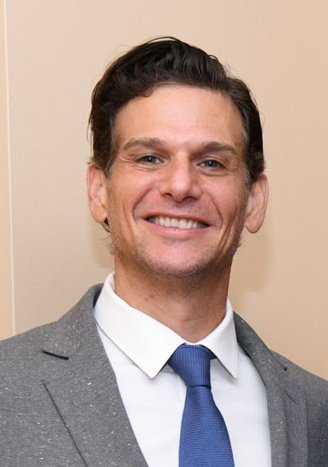
- Mark Kassen in 2020
- Born: October 4, 1971 (age 55)
- Occupations: Actor, director, producer
- Years active: 1994–present
- Relatives: Adam Kassen (brother)

Mark Kassen (born October 4, 1971) is an American actor, director, and producer. He has appeared in the films Growing Up Brady (2000), The Good Student (2006), Puncture (2011), and Jobs (2013). In July 2020, he and Chris Evans launched A Starting Point, a website that presents both the Democratic and Republican point of view on many issues of importance to Americans.

== Career ==
=== Theatre ===
In 1994, he made his theatre debut in a New York Off-Broadway play titled Judy at the Stonewall Inn. A few years later, he was cast in a play called Things You Shouldn't Say Past Midnight, which he appeared on stage totally nude. In 2006, he appeared as Hitler's nephew William Patrick Hitler in the play Little Willy, which he also wrote.

=== Film and television ===
Kassen has had small parts in television films and TV series such as Another World in 1994, Cybill in 1997, and Third Watch in 1999. In 2006, he produced the television movie Bernard and Doris with Susan Sarandon and Ralph Fiennes, which earned him, along with the other producers, nominations for a Golden Globe and Primetime Emmy Award for Best Television Film.

In 2011, he appeared in the drama film Puncture, based on the true story of Michael David Weiss (played by Chris Evans), where Kassen played Weiss's law partner and best friend Paul Danziger. Kassen also directed and produced the film with his brother Adam Kassen.

=== Production company ===
Kassen runs an independent film production company with his younger brother Adam Kassen.

== Filmography ==
Year	Title	Role	Notes
1994	Another World	Jerry Hoch	TV series
1996	ABC Afterschool Specials	Spencer	TV series (Episode: "Through Thick & Thin")
1997	The Killing Secret	Greg Dunleavy	TV film
1997	Cybill	Brad Marks	TV series (Episode: "In Her Dreams")
1998	Looking for Lola	Mike Greenbaum	
1999	Third Watch	Larry Foley	TV series (Episode: "Hell Is What You Make of It")
2000	Growing Up Brady	Eddie Fontaine	TV film
2001	Trigger Happy	Alec	Also producer
2004	Slogan	Matt	TV film; also director, writer and producer
2005	Hopeless Pictures	Various voices	TV series; also producer
2006	The Good Student	Pete Macauley	Also producer
2006	Why Not...		Short; also director and writer
2008	Almost Home	Paul	Short
2011	Puncture	Paul Danziger	Also director and producer
2013	Jobs	Jud	
2014	Dark Around the Stars	Glen	
2014	Before We Go	Danny	Also producer
2026	PH-1	Senator Payton Burnham	Also director
2026	Animals	TBA	Post-production

=== As producer ===
Year	Title	Notes
2001	Trigger Happy	
2003	The Bug	Short
2004	Slogan	
2004	Looking for Kitty	Co-producer
2005	Celebrity Charades	TV series; also director
2005	Hopeless Pictures	
2006	The Sasquatch Gang	
2006	The Good Student	
2006	Bernard and Doris	Executive producer
2007	The Minor Accomplishments of Jackie Woodman	TV series (8 episodes)
2011	Puncture	
2014	Before We Go	
