= Trigger Street Productions =

American entertainment production company

- Type: Subsidiary
- Industry: Film
- Founded: 1997; 29 years ago
- Founder: Kevin Spacey
- Headquarters: Los Angeles, California, United States
- Key people: Dana Brunetti (president)
- Products: Motion pictures, television and digital media
- Parent: Relativity Media
- Website: www.triggerstreet.com

Trigger Street Productions is an American entertainment production company formed by Kevin Spacey in 1997 and further developed by his business partner Dana Brunetti. The company's credits include Captain Phillips, Shakespeare High, Safe, The Social Network, 21, Shrink, Fanboys, the Emmy-nominated Bernard and Doris, Emmy-winning Recount, Mini's First Time, Beyond the Sea, The United States of Leland, The Big Kahuna and House of Cards, as well as stage productions of The Iceman Cometh and Cobb.

== History ==
Trigger Street Productions was founded in 1997 by actor Kevin Spacey. The name "Trigger Street" is a reference to an actual street in Spacey's boyhood home of Chatsworth, where Roy Rogers and Dale Evans (and Roy's horse Trigger) had their ranch. Spacey and his childhood friends dreamed of opening a neighborhood theater where they could stage their own "Trigger Street" productions.

Shortly after the company was formed, Trigger Street Productions had signed a deal with Fine Line Features in order to release films for a two-year period. In 2001, Trigger Street Productions was then signed to a contract with film financer Intermedia in order to finance future Trigger Street features, for a first-look deal, which resulted in the founder's involvement in producing K-PAX. In 2011, the company signed a deal with Sony Pictures. In 2015, the company had launched a television division with a deal at Fox 21 Television Studios.

In January 2016 it was announced that Relativity Media, which was just emerging from Chapter 11 bankruptcy, had acquired Trigger Street Productions and that Spacey would become chairman of Relativity Studios whilst Brunetti would become the studio's president. Spacey called the move “an incredible opportunity to make great entertainment” and said he considered it the “next evolution in my career.”, and Brunetti said, "Being a disruptor at heart, I look forward to the opportunities that being inside a studio system will present."

However, when the paperwork for the studio was filed for the court it emerged that Spacey had opted out of assuming the chairmanship of the studios, and by the end of 2016 Brunetti had also left Relativity whilst both remained Executive Producers on House of Cards and Manhunt: Unabomber (previous working title: Manifesto). In May 2018, Relativity Media filed for bankruptcy again.

== Trigger Street Labs ==
Trigger Street Labs was developed by Dana Brunetti and launched in 2002 as an online community for unrepresented writers and filmmakers. In its first few years it had thousands of online users uploading their work, reviewing work by their peers, and participating in online competitions and short film festivals. The site was previously sponsored by Stella Artois, and in October 2009, Artois hosted the Stella Artois Short Film Project. The project was hosted on the site, and awarded the grand prize of US$50,000 to Jason Klein for his short film A Perfect Time.

=== Trigg.la ===
Trigg.la is a spin-off website from Trigger Street Labs. It hosts several podcasts, a filmmaking blog, and information about other Los Angeles-based industries.

==== Triggla podcasts ====
Triggla's podcasts, which are now off-air, were categorized under the headings of the arts, music, society and culture, and technology. In addition there was a podcast by the porn star Kayden Kross called Kayden's Review which reviewed mainstream films.

One of the podcasts, The First 15, was co-hosted by Carter Swan, vice president of Trigger Street Productions, and screenwriter Philip Eisner. The show featured a different would-be screenwriter each week who was interviewed via Skype and advised on how to make improvements to the first fifteen pages of their script. The screenplays originated from the Trigger Street Labs website.

== Jameson First Shot ==
In 2011, the company teamed up with Jameson Irish Whiskey to create Jameson First Shot, which was an opportunity to give three up-and-coming filmmakers a 'first shot' in the movie business by producing their short film starring an A-List actor. In the competition's first year the actor was Kevin Spacey. Each year the competition features a new actor and a new set of finalists to work with that actor. In the first years of the competition only one finalist was selected from each of these three territories: the United States, South Africa and Russia. In later years the competition was opened up to include more territories, but still only produced three winning scripts. The resulting films are debuted in a red carpet screening and screened online on Jameson's YouTube channel. The competition has run annually ever since its first year with a new set of winners and a new leading actor or actress.

2012 – Kevin Spacey

- Benjamin Leavitt, The Ventriloquist, USA
- Aleksey Nuzhny, Envelope, Russia
- Alan Shelley, Spirit of a Denture, South Africa

2013 – Willem Dafoe

- Hanneke Schutte, Saving Norman, South Africa
- Anton Lanshakov, The Smile Man, Russia
- Shirlyn Wong, Love's Routine, USA

2014 – Uma Thurman

- Henco J, The Mundane Goddess, South Africa
- Ivan Petukhov, The Gift, Russia
- Jessica Valentine, Jump, USA

2015 – Adrien Brody

- Mark Middlewick, The Mascot, South Africa
- Travis Calvert, The Library Book, USA
- Stephan Tempier, Boredom, Canada

2016 – Maggie Gyllenhaal

- Cameron Thrower, Beauty Mark, USA
- Kat Wood, Home, UK
- Jason Perini, The New Empress, Australia

2017 – Dominic West

== Filmography ==
=== Films ===
- Gran Turismo (2023)
- Fifty Shades Freed (2018)
- Fifty Shades Darker (2017)
- Fifty Shades of Grey (2015)
- Captain Phillips (2013)
- The Ventriloquist (Jameson First Shot USA short)
- Envelope (Jameson First Shot Russian short)
- Spirit of a Denture (Jameson First Shot South African short)
- Safe (2012)
- Inseparable (2011)
- Casino Jack (2010)
- The Social Network (2010)
- Father of Invention (2010)
- Shrink (2009)
- Fanboys (2008)
- Columbus Day (2008)
- 21 (2008)
- Mini's First Time (2006)
- The Sasquatch Gang (2006)
- The Good Student (2006)
- Edison (2005)
- Beyond the Sea (2004)
- TriggerStreet.com (2004)
- The United States of Leland (2003)
- Interstate 84
- Ordinary Decent Criminal (2000)
- The Big Kahuna (1999)

=== Direct-to-video and TV ===
- Manhunt: Unabomber (2017, Discovery Channel)
- House of Cards (2013, Netflix)
- Bernard and Doris (2008, HBO)
- Recount (2008, HBO)
- Going Hollywood (2005)
- America Rebuilds: A Year at Ground Zero (2002)
- Uncle Frank (2002, HBO)
