= David B. Capes =

Biblical scholar

- Born: David Bryan Capes; 16 December 1955; Atlanta
- Education: Doctor of Philosophy
- Alma mater: Mercer University - Atlanta; Southwestern Baptist Theological Seminary
- Occupation: Biblical scholar, university teacher
- Employer: Houston Christian University; Houston Graduate School of Theology; Wheaton College (2017–)
- Website: davidbcapes.com

David Bryan Capes (born December 16, 1955) is Director of the Lanier Theological Library in Houston Texas. He is also a teacher at Baylor University’s Truett Seminary and has previously been Professor of New Testament at Wheaton College (Illinois).

He was the lead editor of The Voice. He also co-hosts a radio show.

== Life ==
=== Education ===
In 1978, Capes earned his BA at Mercer University in Atlanta. In 1982, he earned an M.Div. from Southwestern Baptist Theological Seminary. In 1990, he earned his PhD in New Testament at the Southwestern Baptist Theological Seminary under the tutelage of E. Earle Ellis.

=== Teaching ===
Capes taught at Wheaton College and at Houston Baptist University.

=== Field of work ===
Capes's field of work has been the Apostle Paul, Christology, and intertextuality. In 2020, he was appointed as New Testament editor at the Word Biblical Commentary series.

== Bibliography ==
=== Theses ===
- Paul's Use of Old Testament Yahweh Texts and Its Implications for His Christology (PhD diss.). OCLC 233978632.

=== Books ===
- Capes, David B. (1992). Old Testament Yahweh Texts in Paul's Christology (PDF). J.C.B. Mohr. ISBN 9783161458194.
- Capes, David B.: The Last Eye Witness (2006)
- Capes, David B.: Israel's God and Rebecca's Children (2007)
- Capes, David B.: Rediscovering Jesus (2015) ISBN 978-0830824724
- Richards, E. Randolph; Capes, David B.; Reeves, Rodney (2017). Rediscovering Paul: An Introduction to His World, Letters, and Theology. InterVarsity Press. ISBN 9780830889020.
- Capes, David B.; et al. (Craig Evans) (2018). The Divine Christ (Acadia Studies in Bible and Theology): Paul, the Lord Jesus, and the Scriptures of Israel. Acadia Studies in Bible and Theology. Baker Books. ISBN 9781493413324.
- Capes, David B. Who Do You Say I Am? (2020)
- Capes, David B. Matthew Through Old Testament Eyes (2024)
- Capes, David B. Does It Matter Who Wrote the Bible?: The Pastoral Implications of Pseudepigraphy and Anonymity in the New Testament (2025)
- Capes, David B.: The Footsteps of Jesus in the Holy Land
- Capes, David B.: The Voice of Hebrews
- Capes, David B.: The Voice of Romans

== Family ==
He is married to Cathy Ann Hall and they have three sons.

== Sources ==
- McDowell, Josh; McDowell, Sean (2017). Evidence That Demands a Verdict: Life-Changing Truth for a Skeptical World. Thomas Nelson. ISBN 9781401676711.
- McKnight, Scot; Gupta, Nijay K., eds. (2019). The State of New Testament Studies: A Survey of Recent Research. Baker Academic. ISBN 9781493419807.
- Wheaton College. "Dr. David Capes". Archived from the original on 2018-06-18.
- Wheaton College (2017-04-17). "Dr. David Capes Named Associate Dean of Biblical & Theological Studies, Professor of New Testament".
- "David B. Capes". bakerpublishinggroup.com.
