= Before We Go =

2014 film directed by Chris Evans

- Theatrical release poster
- Directed by: Chris Evans
- Screenplay by: Ronald Bass; Jen Smolka; Chris Shafer; Paul Vicknair
- Story by: Ronald Bass; Jen Smolka
- Produced by: Chris Evans; Mark Kassen; McG; Mary Viola; Karen Baldwin; Howard Baldwin; William J. Immerman
- Starring: Chris Evans; Alice Eve
- Cinematography: John Guleserian
- Edited by: John Axelrad
- Music by: Chris Westlake
- Production company: Wonderland Sound and Vision
- Distributed by: RADiUS
- Release dates: September 12, 2014 (TIFF); July 21, 2015 (United States)
- Running time: 95 minutes
- Country: United States
- Language: English
- Budget: $3 million
- Box office: $483,938

Before We Go is a 2014 American romantic drama film directed by Chris Evans in his directorial debut. It stars Evans (who also co-produced) and Alice Eve as two strangers stuck in Manhattan, New York City, for the night.

The film had its world premiere in the Special Presentations section of the 39th Toronto International Film Festival on September 12, 2014. It was released on video on demand on July 21, 2015, and had a limited theatrical release in the United States on September 4, 2015. Before We Go received generally negative reviews from critics and underperformed at the box office, grossing $483,938 on a budget of $3 million.

== Plot ==
Busking in Grand Central Terminal, Nick Vaughan sees Brooke Dalton drop her phone while running to catch a train. She misses it, so she returns to the station, where Nick returns her broken phone.

Nick then finds Brooke standing outside the terminal, who confesses she has just been robbed and is trapped in the city. He offers to pay for a cab to take her to New Haven but his credit cards don't work. When Nick tries to call a friend to lend him the money, his phone has died. He offers to get Brooke a room for the night, but she insists she must reach New Haven by morning.

Deciding to help Brooke find her purse, Nick tracks it down at a sweatshop that deals in stolen purses. He heads inside to retrieve it while she uses a payphone to call her husband. Afterward, Brooke convinces passing police officers to investigate the building, the sweatshop owners get spooked, punch Nick, and run out with the bag.

Nick and Brooke then head for Nick's friend's wedding reception, hoping to borrow money. Along the way, they both open up about why they're in New York. Brooke had just sold a painting and was going to surprise her husband by coming home early. Nick has an audition for a band he has been dreaming of playing with.

Instead of reaching the reception, they stumble upon an event where they are mistaken for members of the band. Nick and Brooke perform "My Funny Valentine" and flee when the real band shows up. After their last-ditch attempt to get a bus to New Haven fails for lack of funds, Brooke borrows a phone, calls a friend, and begs her to retrieve the letter she has left for her husband that she does not want him to read.

Elated that her problem is now solved, Brooke offers to accompany Nick to the reception and pretend to be his girlfriend in front of his ex, Hannah. There, once Nick sees Hannah and meets her new boyfriend, he leaves abruptly. Outside, he explains this was the first time he had seen Hannah since she rejected his marriage proposal and broke up with him six years ago.

At Brooke's insistence, Nick goes back to speak to Hannah and discovers that she is pregnant, so he finally gets closure. Wandering around the city, the two find a psychic who is still open. After he reads her future, he allows Brooke to use his phone so she learns her friend couldn't retrieve the letter.

After leaving the psychic, Brooke reveals that she discovered that her husband was cheating on her. Though he ended the relationship, she discovered that he was going to see his mistress again. Devastated, she wrote him a letter ending their marriage and went to New York for work. However, during her trip when her husband called to say he was coming home early, she realized he must have broken ties with his mistress.

At a restaurant, Nick tells Brooke that her husband will most likely understand why she wrote him the letter. She worried about the possible end of her marriage, sneaks out the back of the restaurant and tries to hail a cab to the airport to fly to her mother's in Indiana.

Nick appears, frustrated that Brooke tried to bail on him, and they argue. Going to Nick's friend's hotel room, they unwind from the night's adventures. They then share a kiss, write on the back of paintings in the room (a reference to an earlier encounter with a painting with erotic writing on its back) and reflect on their night.

In the morning, they return to the train station. Just before they part, Nick makes a pretend call from a phone booth. Using it as a "time machine" he calls himself in the past, saying he will meet a woman and "you will need her more than she needs you". They share one last kiss and finally part.

On her way home, Brooke finds a guest service paper they had filled out at the hotel. On the bottom, it says, "Turn over". After reading what is on the back, she smiles.

== Cast ==
- Chris Evans as Nick Vaughan
- Alice Eve as Brooke Dalton
- Emma Fitzpatrick as Hannah Dempsey
- Mark Kassen as Danny
- Daniel Spink as Tyler
- Elijah Moreland as Cole
- John Cullum as Harry
- Scott Evans as Concierge

== Production ==
The film, originally titled 1:30 Train, was first announced in August 2013, when Chris Evans signed on to star, as well as make his directorial debut. In October Alice Eve signed on to play the female lead.

Filming began in December 2013 in Manhattan's Lower East Side and lasted for 19 days.

In July 2014, it was announced that the film would premiere at the 2014 Toronto International Film Festival, and that the title had been changed to Before We Go.

The film is scored by Chris Westlake.

== Release ==
The film had its world premiere at the 2014 Toronto International Film Festival on September 12, 2014. Prior to the premiere it was announced Radius-TWC had acquired all distribution rights to the film. The film then went on to screen at the Seattle International Film Festival on May 22, 2015. The film was released on video on demand on July 21, 2015, and in theaters in a limited release on September 4, 2015.

=== Home media ===
Before We Go was released on DVD and Blu-ray on November 3, 2015, and was added to Netflix Instant Streaming on March 1, 2016.

== Reception ==
On review aggregator website Rotten Tomatoes, the film holds an approval rating of 28% based on 32 reviews, with an average rating of 2.7/10. The site's critics consensus reads, "Chris Evans' directorial debut is modest to a fault, with a threadbare story and minimal style leaving his and Alice Eve's likable performances adrift in New York City with nowhere to go." Metacritic assigned the film a weighted average score of 31 out of 100, based on 10 critics, indicating "generally unfavorable reviews".

== Soundtrack ==
Title	Performer(s)
Into the Sea	Aiden Hawken
England	The National
My Funny Valentine	Alice Eve
Only Yesterday	Taken by trees
Move On	Andre Lockington
The Alchemy Between Us	Young Galaxy
I'm Too Sexy	Alice Eve
Best Part of Me	St Leonards
So Here We Are	Bloc Party
Flaws	Vancouver Sleep Clinic
