= Puncture (film) =

- Theatrical release poster
- Directed by: Adam Kassen; Mark Kassen
- Written by: Chris Lopata
- Story by: Ela Thier; Paul Danziger
- Produced by: Adam Kassen; Mark Kassen; Jordan Foley
- Starring: Chris Evans; Mark Kassen; Vinessa Shaw; Brett Cullen; Michael Biehn; Marshall Bell
- Cinematography: Helge Gerull
- Edited by: Chip Smith
- Music by: Ryan Ross Smith
- Production company: Millennium Entertainment
- Distributed by: Millennium Entertainment
- Release date: April 21, 2011 (Tribeca)
- Running time: 99 minutes
- Country: United States
- Language: English
- Box office: $123,700

Puncture (released under the title Injustice in the United Kingdom) is an independent feature film starring Chris Evans, directed by Adam Kassen and Mark Kassen. The film is based on the true story of Michael David "Mike" Weiss and Paul Danziger. It was chosen as one of the spotlight films for the 2011 Tribeca Film Festival, premiering on April 21, 2011, in New York City.

== Plot ==
Mike Weiss, a young Houston lawyer and drug addict, and Paul Danziger, his longtime friend and straitlaced law partner, are the personal injury lawyers behind the law firm Danziger & Weiss. They decide to take on a case involving Vicky Rogers, a local ER nurse, who was pricked by a contaminated needle on the job and contracted HIV. Vicky shows Mike and Paul a safety needle, invented by her family friend, Jeffrey Dancort, which defends against accidental needlesticks by only being used once, and she urges them to help bring the product to hospitals. Vicky later dies from her illness. Mike digs deeper into the case, and discovers no one is willing to buy the needle because of a healthcare/pharmaceutical conspiracy and bribery racket. With the threat of exposure, heavyweight attorneys move in on the defense led by attorney Nathaniel Price. Out of their league and out of money, the mounting pressure of the case pushes the two underdog lawyers and their business to the breaking point.

In the meantime, Mike is struggling with his heavy drug usage and his loneliness. He seeks sex therapy as a source of comfort and is consistently in the company of prostitutes. His personal struggles hinder the realization of his professional ambitions, as he misses many of the meetings and investment events, driving a wedge between him and Paul.

Mike, Paul, and Dancort gain the support of Senator O'Reilly, not before she gives Mike an ultimatum: get clean. Mike's heavy withdrawal leaves him hospitalized, only adding to the financial burdens of the firm. The momentum of the case seems to come to a standstill: Senator O'Reilly pulls out after United Medical Health Supplies lobbies for her re-election campaign and Paul, with a new baby at home, is not interested in pursuing the case over his family.

They meet with Nathaniel Price, and he offers a settlement, the tipping point for the conflict between Mike and Paul. Their conflict comes to a head as Mike argues to take the case to trial and seek justice, while Paul protests there is no feasible way they can continue all the way financially. Mike meets a former employee of Thompson Needle Manufacturers and a friend of Vicky's, who implores him to continue the case on behalf of the lives affected by used needles, which spread AIDS and hepatitis worldwide. Mike meets with Nathaniel Price and pledges he will personally find new clients and hospital employees affected by these unsafe needles across the country. However, the next day, Paul finds Mike dead from an overdose.

At the settlement conference, Paul walks in with famous personal injury attorney Mark Lanier, declining the settlement and proclaiming that they will see them in court. The movie's postscript tells the audience that in 2004, Attorney Lanier settled a lawsuit against one of the nation's largest medical supply manufacturers for over $150 million. "As a result, thousands of hospitals throughout the United States now use safety needles."

== Cast ==
- Chris Evans as Atty. Michael David 'Mike' Weiss - Drug addict partner
- Mark Kassen as Atty. Paul Danziger - Family man partner
- Marshall Bell as Jeffrey Dancort - Safetypoint needle inventor
- Michael Biehn as Red - Vicky's friend and former employee of Thompson Needle
- Vinessa Shaw as Vicky Rogers - Nurse with AIDS
- Jesse L. Martin as Atty. Daryl King friend
- Brett Cullen as Nathaniel Price - Attorney for United Medical group
- Kate Burton as Senator O'Reilly
- Erinn Allison as Kim Danziger - Paul's pregnant wife
- Roxanna Hope as Sylvia - Legal secretary
- Jennifer Blanc as Stephany - Price employee
- W. Mark Lanier as himself - Plaintiff trial attorney
- Austin Stowell as ER Medic

== Production ==
The original story was written by Danziger. Filming began on February 10, 2010, in Texas. The film was directed by Adam Kassen and Mark Kassen. Adam Kassen was quoted as saying, "From the moment we heard about this story, we connected to what it says about the current state of our medical industry and the flawed hero that tries to fix it." The director dedicated the film to the real life attorney Michael David Weiss who died in 1999 of a drug overdose at age 32.

== Release ==
After the film premiered at the 2011 Tribeca Film Festival, Millennium Films acquired the distribution rights. It had a limited release on September 23, 2011, and played in five theaters. The total domestic gross was $68,945.

Puncture was released on DVD and Blu-ray on January 3, 2012. The film promotes safe needle use worldwide.

== Reception ==
Rotten Tomatoes, a review aggregator, reports that 51% of 41 surveyed critics gave the film a positive review, and the average rating was 5.6/10; the site consensus reads: "There's a compelling story at the heart of Puncture but viewers will have to pierce through the formulaic storytelling to find it." Metacritic rated it 54/100 based on 17 reviews.

Roger Ebert rated it 3/4 stars and wrote that Evans' performance upstages the issues raised in the film. On Evans' performance, Ebert writes, "Electrifying in the role, Evans reminds me of other great out-of-control druggies played by Al Pacino and Nicolas Cage. A movie like this is a reminder that box-office success can be unfair and limiting to gifted young actors."

Kirk Honeycutt of The Hollywood Reporter wrote, "The film is chock-a-block with extraordinary performances and no one will fault the filmmaking either. This is a well-made movie, make no mistake. It just suffers from a dysfunctional hero." Ronnie Scheib of Variety wrote, "Though conceptually intriguing, the mix of downward drug spiral with uphill struggle for good never really coalesces." Jeannette Catsoulis of The New York Times wrote, "Notable at least in part for its fumbled potential, this health-care-industry melodrama possesses all the right ingredients: an idealistic young lawyer, a corrupt corporate villain and a sympathetic victim. It just fails to assemble them into a compelling whole."
