= Looking for Lola =

- Movie Poster
- Directed by: Boaz Davidson
- Written by: Boaz Davidson & John Thompson (Story); Les Weldon (Screenplay)
- Produced by: Boaz Davidson; John Thompson
- Starring: Mark Kassen; Ara Celi; Adam Biesk; Vincent Ventresca
- Cinematography: Irek Hartowicz
- Edited by: Sabine El Gemayel; Alain Jakubowicz
- Music by: Robert O. Ragland
- Production company: Nu Image / Millennium Films
- Distributed by: Dow Knut Productions Inc.
- Release date: December 31, 1997; (USA) (Theatrical Release)
- Running time: 92 minutes
- Country: United States
- Language: English/Spanish

Looking for Lola is a 1997 American romantic comedy film, starring Mark Kassen and Ara Celi. It was co-written, co-produced and directed by Boaz Davidson.

== Plot ==
Mike is living an unsuccessful life, but lies to his parents about it. He meets Lola, a beautiful, Mexican dancer. When Mike's parents decide to visit him, he convinces Lola to pretend to be his girlfriend.

== Cast ==
- Mark Kassen as Mike Greenbaum
- Ara Celi as Lola
- Adam Biesk as Benny
- Vincent Ventresca as Tony
- Kurt Fuller as Dr. Gregory Hinson
- Michael Kagan as Max Greenbaum
- Brenda Pickleman as Doris Greenbaum
- Leeza Davidson as Sally Greenbaum
