= Paula Devicq =

Canadian actress

- Born: Paula Michelle Devicq; Edmonton, Alberta, Canada
- Occupation: Actress
- Years active: 1985–present
- Spouse(s): Joseph Lyle Taylor (2001-?; divorced)
- Partner: Scott Wolf (1996–1997)

Paula Michelle Devicq is a Canadian actress, known for her role as Kirsten Bennett on the television drama Party of Five, a role she played from 1994 to 2000.

== Life and career ==
Devicq was born in Edmonton, Alberta.

She began her modeling career at the age of 18. She primarily worked in New York and Paris, where she was represented by modeling agencies Ford and Elite, and would go on to appear on magazine covers and in major advertising campaigns for companies such as Estée Lauder.

She played ADA Cynthia Bennington in the A&E network series 100 Centre Street starring Alan Arkin and directed by Sidney Lumet. She then followed up with a recurring role on Rescue Me and earlier in her career starred in the TV movie Wounded Heart, an emotional drama set in Texas. As a native of Edmonton and Vancouver, she practiced figure skating two hours before and after school each day. She appeared in the feature films Forbidden Love, with Andrew McCarthy and Richard Chamberlain, and Arbitrage, opposite Richard Gere and Susan Sarandon. She also played a role in Party of Five as Kirsten Bennett for six seasons.

== Filmography ==
Year	Title	Role	Notes
1994–2000	Party of Five	Kirsten Bennett	89 episodes
1995	Wounded Heart	Tracy Lance	TV, credited as Paula DeVicq
1997	Dinner and Driving	Laura	
1999	Kill the Man	Vicki Livingston	
1999	Runaway Bride	Paula	
2001–2002	100 Centre Street	Cynthia Bennington	12 episodes
2004	The Breakup Artist	Teresa	
2004	The Grid	Jane McCann	TV mini-series unknown episodes
2004	The Coven	Kate Moore	
2004–2005	Rescue Me	Sondra	6 episodes
2005	His and Her Christmas	Vicki	
2005	Law & Order	Miranda Shea	Episode: "Obsession"
2006	The Good Student	Holly Cooper	
2007	Law & Order: Criminal Intent	Christine Mayfield	1 episode
2008	Pinion	Lynn	
2010	First Dog	Vicky Ann	
2011	A Gifted Man	Dr. Elizabeth Salinger	1 episode
2011	Arbitrage	Cindy	
2012	Making Angels	Lydia	
2015	The Amazing Wizard of Paws	Sandra	
2019	Forbidden Love	Jennifer	aka Finding Julia
