= The Killing Secret =

- Based on: The murder of Emily Garcia
- Written by: Rob Fresco
- Directed by: Noel Nosseck
- Starring: Ari Meyers; Soleil Moon Frye; Tess Harper; Mark Kassen
- Country of origin: United States
- Original language: English

Production
- Producer: Philip K. Kleinbart

Original release
- Network: NBC
- Release: January 6, 1997

The Killing Secret (also known as The Secret) is a 1997 made-for-television drama that originally aired on January 6 on NBC. The film, directed by Noel Nosseck and produced by Philip K. Kleinbart, starred Ari Meyers, Soleil Moon Frye, Tess Harper, and Mark Kassen.

== Plot ==
The Killing Secret was thought to be based on the true story of Emily Garcia, however, her murder was later solved and does not match the storyline of the film. It may also have been based in part on the murder of Becky Stowe by her boyfriend Robert Leamon.

In the film, Greg (Kassen) is dating Nicole (Meyers) but sleeps with Emily (Frye), who becomes pregnant. Faced with the loss of his college athletic scholarship, Greg kills Emily. The film revolves around the investigation and eventual arrest and conviction of Greg for the murder.

== Home Video ==
The Killing Secret was released on DVD in the United States in 2006.
