= Sam Harless =

Texas politician

Member of the Texas House of Representatives from the 126th district
- Incumbent
- Assumed office January 8, 2019
- Preceded by: Kevin Roberts
- Succeeded by: Stefanie Bord (elect)

Personal details
- Born: Eric Tedd Harless; July 13, 1962 (age 64)
- Party: Republican
- Spouse: Patricia Fincher (m. 1986)
- Children: 1
- Education: Lone Star College; Sam Houston State University
- Website: Campaign website

Eric Tedd Harless (born July 13, 1962) is a Texas Republican politician that serves District 126 in the Texas House of Representatives.

He is the husband of Patricia Harless.

== Personal life ==
In 1981 Harless graduated from Spring High School, he then attended Lone Star College, and later attended Sam Houston State University. He married Patricia Fincher in 1986, they have one son. Harless is a member of Champion Forest Baptist Church.

Today, he and his wife Patricia own Fred Fincher Motors, a second-generation independent automobile dealership.

His wife Patricia served in the Texas House representing the same district from 2007–2016.

== Political career ==
Harless serves in the Texas House of Representatives for District 126. He was sworn in on January 8, 2019 succeeding Kevin Roberts. Harless is affiliated with the Republican Party.

In May 2023, Harless was one of two Republicans on the House Committee on Community Safety for the 88th Legislature (along with Justin Holland), who voted to advance HB 2744 to the full House chamber. The bill, which was championed by relatives of those killed in the 2022 Robb Elementary School shooting in Uvalde, Texas, seeks to raise the age to purchase certain semi-automatic weapons from 18 to 21 − and Harless' vote came just two days after eight people were killed in the 2023 shooting at an outlet mall in Allen, Texas.

At the 2026 Texas House of Representatives election, he was unseated by Democrat Stefanie Bord.
