= Kevin Roberts (politician) =

American politician

Member of the Texas House of Representatives from the 126th district
- In office January 8, 2017 – January 8, 2019
- Preceded by: Patricia Harless
- Succeeded by: Sam Harless

Personal details
- Born: January 16, 1966 (age 60) Amarillo, Texas, U.S.
- Party: Republican
- Spouse: Hollie Lanier Roberts
- Children: 2
- Education: Texas Tech University

Kevin Dale Roberts (born January 16, 1966) is a former politician who served one term in the Texas House of Representatives for District 126 in Harris County. He resides in Spring, Texas.

== State Representative election of 2016 ==
Roberts ran without opposition in the Republican legislative primary on March 1, 2016, after the Republican incumbent, Patricia Harless, did not seek re-election. In the general election on November 8, 2016, Roberts received 58 percent of the ballots cast defeating Democrat, Joy Dawson-Thomas, and Libertarian Party candidate, Eric Moquin.

== Congressional election of 2018 ==
Upon the announcement of incumbent U.S. Representative Ted Poe's retirement effective in January 2019, Roberts announced his candidacy for the seat against a crowded field of nine other challengers. After Roberts placed first in the March 6th primary with 33 percent of the vote, Roberts faced retired U.S. Navy SEAL Dan Crenshaw in a primary runoff election. A negative super PAC, funded by Roberts' brother-in-law, Mark Lanier, ran ads opposing Crenshaw's candidacy for the nomination.

Roberts was defeated by Crenshaw in the May 22 Republican run-off primary by more than a 2 to 1 margin. Roberts finished with 30.2 percent of the vote, compared to Crenshaw's 69.8 percent. Crenshaw won the seat in the general election on November 6, 2018.

Texas House of Representatives
Preceded by Patricia Harless	Texas State Representative for the 126th district (Harris County); 2017–2019	Succeeded by Sam Harless (husband of Patricia Harless)
