= Hopeless Pictures =

American animated sitcom

- Written by: Eric Gilliland
- Starring: Michael McKean; Bob Balaban; Lisa Kudrow
- Country of origin: United States
- No. of seasons: 1
- No. of episodes: 9

Production
- Executive producers: Debbie Demontreux; Adam Kassan; Mark Kassan
- Running time: 16-27 minutes
- Production companies: Trigger Street Independent; Chicago Films; World Away Productions

Original release
- Network: IFC
- Release: August 19 – October 14, 2005

Hopeless Pictures is an American adult animated sitcom starring the voices of Lisa Kudrow and Bob Balaban, and produced and broadcast by the IFC. The cartoon follows fictional film producer Mel Wax, voiced by Michael McKean, in a spoof of the Hollywood movie industry. Stylistically the show makes use of the audio from scripted telephone conversations combined with on-screen gags surrounding the cartoon characters speaking.

== Series Overview ==
Mel Wax is the founder of Hopeless Pictures, a down-on-its-luck film production studio. He runs the studio with the help of his depressed nephew Sam and secretary Traci, whom Mel has an affair with. Coupled with the bad fortunes of his studio, Mel is tormented by other flaws in his life, such as the divorce from his wife Sandy due to his infidelity. He enlists the help of his therapist Dr. Stein as he tries to keep his life and studio afloat. Also there to assist are his deceased parents Hope and Les, who Mel named the studio after, as they return as ghosts to give their son sparse advice on the film industry.

== Cast ==
- Michael McKean as Mel Wax
- Jennifer Coolidge as Traci
- Bob Balaban as Sam
- Jonathan Katz as Dr. Stein
- Lisa Kudrow as Sandy
- Mina Kolb as Hope
- David Lander as Les
