= Adam Kassen =

American actor

Adam Kassen (born May 27, 1974) is an American independent film director, actor, writer, and producer. He frequently collaborates with his brother Mark Kassen.

== Career ==
In 2006, Kassen executive produced Bernard and Doris, which earned him an Emmy Award nomination for "Outstanding Made for Television Movie".

Adam made his directorial debut with his brother, Mark Kassen, on the 2011 feature film Puncture, starring Chris Evans. The Tribeca Film Festival selected the picture as one of its spotlight features in the 2011 program.

== Filmography ==
- Puncture (director)
- Bernard and Doris (co-executive producer)
- The Sasquatch Gang (co-producer)
- The Good Student (co-producer)
- Big Sur (2012) (co-producer)
