= Kill the Man =

- Directed by: Tom Booker; Jon Kean
- Written by: Tom Booker; Jon Kean
- Produced by: Gary Binkow; Heidi Lester; Julie Lynn; Andy Martin; Marshall Persinger; Joyce Schweickert
- Starring: Luke Wilson; Joshua Malina; Paula Devicq
- Cinematography: Mark Mervis
- Edited by: Sean Albertson
- Music by: Paul Mills
- Distributed by: Summit Entertainment
- Release date: January 24, 1999 (Sundance Film Festival)
- Running time: 88 minutes
- Country: United States
- Language: English

Kill the Man is a 1999 American comedy film starring Luke Wilson and Joshua Malina as the owners of an independent photocopier shop who are in competition with a large chain of copy shops.

== Cast ==
- Luke Wilson as Stanley Simon
- Joshua Malina as Bob Stein
- Paula Devicq as Vicki Livingston
- Phillip Rhys as Seth
- Phil LaMarr as Marky Marx
- Jim Fyfe as Guy
- Teri Garr as Mrs. Livingston
- Michael McKean as Mr. Livingston
- Lisa Robin Kelly as Nan
- Eve Plumb as Revolutionary #3
- Brian Doyle-Murray as Grumpy Senior
- Richard Riehle as Mr. Ellias
