= Tim Skousen =

Tim Skousen is an American screenwriter, producer, and director.

He grew up in London, The Bahamas, Washington, D.C., Santiago, and Winter Park, Florida. He graduated from Brigham Young University in 2001 with a degree in Media Arts.

== Career ==
Skousen wrote, produced, and directed the award-winning short film Leon in 2001. He produced, filmed, and edited the 2004 documentary film Awful Normal.

Skousen was first assistant director on the 2004 comedy Baptists at Our Barbecue, and the 2004 feature film Napoleon Dynamite.

Skousen directed the 2006 comedy feature film The Sasquatch Gang, starring Jeremy Sumpter.

In 2011, Skousen directed the documentary film Zero Percent. It follows several inmates at the Sing Sing Correctional Facility who are involved with the Hudson Link for Higher Education in Prison.
