= Safe (2012 film) =

2012 American action thriller film

- Theatrical release poster
- Directed by: Boaz Yakin
- Written by: Boaz Yakin
- Produced by: Lawrence Bender; Dana Brunetti; Joseph Zolfo
- Starring: Jason Statham
- Cinematography: Stefan Czapsky
- Edited by: Frederic Thoraval
- Music by: Mark Mothersbaugh
- Production companies: IM Global; Lawrence Bender Productions; Trigger Street Productions; Automatik 87Eleven Productions
- Distributed by: Lionsgate
- Release date: April 27, 2012
- Running time: 95 minutes
- Country: United States
- Languages: English; Mandarin; Russian
- Budget: $30 million
- Box office: $40.6 million

Safe is a 2012 American action thriller film written and directed by Boaz Yakin, produced by Lawrence Bender, Dana Brunetti, and Joseph Zolfo, and starring Jason Statham, Chris Sarandon, Robert John Burke, and James Hong. In the film, Luke Wright, an ex-cop and former cage fighter, winds up protecting a gifted child being chased by the Russian mafia, Chinese triads, and corrupt NYPD officers.

Safe was released by Lionsgate Films on April 27, 2012; it received mixed reviews from critics. The film grossed $40.6 million worldwide against a budget of $30 million.

== Plot ==
Luke Wright, an ex-cop and cage fighter, unintentionally wins a fixed fight. Emile Docheski, the head of the Russian mafia, tells his son Vassily and his men to kill Wright's pregnant wife as punishment, then kill anyone Luke interacts with regularly. Luke thus leaves his life behind, becoming homeless and aimless.

Mei, a young mathematical prodigy in China, is kidnapped by men working for triad boss Han Jiao. He plans to use Mei as a mental calculator to eliminate his criminal enterprise's traceable digital footprint. Han sends her to NYC in the care of brutal gangster Quan Chang.

One year later, Han arrives from China, asking Mei to memorize a long number. On the way to retrieve a second number, their vehicle is ambushed by the Russian mafia. Mei is taken to Emile, who demands the number. They are ambushed by police sent by the corrupt Captain Wolf, who works for Han.

Mei escapes to a nearby subway station, where Luke is contemplating suicide. He pauses at the edge when Mei looks at him. Recognizing Chemyakin as one of the men who killed his wife and seeing that they're chasing Mei, Luke boards the train and kills Chemyakin and the other Russians. Mei flees, only to be stopped by two corrupt detectives, working for Wolf.

Luke incapacitates them, convincing Mei that he is good, and grabs a car, escaping with her. Hiding in a hotel, Mei explains the number and her situation to Luke. Luke guesses that it is a combination to a safe. Quan tracks Mei down through her cell phone and escapes with her as Luke fights through his men.

Across town, Captain Wolf meets with Mayor Danny Tremello, who cautions Wolf, explaining that Luke was not a regular cop, but a black ops hitman. He was lent as a favor to Tremello by friends in the CIA after 9/11, along with Luke's former partner Alex Rosen. The two had assassinated crime bosses in an effort to impose order, but Luke quit after exposing Wolf's detective squad as dirty cops.

Luke now regrets the things he did for the government. Using Chemyakin's phone, he kidnaps Vassily. Emile reluctantly accepts a deal for his son's life, explaining that Mei's number unlocks a heavily guarded safe in Chinatown with $30 million, though he does not know the contents of the second safe. Needing a team to get to it, Luke recruits Wolf and his detectives, enticing them with the money.

Together, they fight through triad gangsters to reach the safe. Wolf attempts to betray Luke, but he kills the remaining detectives and takes Wolf hostage. Using the money, Luke bribes Alex, now the mayor's aide and boyfriend, into rescuing Mei. Alex reveals the second safe belongs to the mayor, containing a disc with incriminating data on every crime syndicate in New York. Alex kills Quan and his men in order to take Mei.

Luke attacks the mayor and retrieves a copy of the mayor's disc. Meeting Alex, he refuses to surrender the money and suggests that they settle it with a fight. However, Mei shoots Alex, wounding him, and letting Luke finish him off.

In the aftermath, Luke gives $50,000 to Wolf for his troubles and instructs him to return Vassily to his father. He sends the remainder of the money to Han to buy Mei's freedom, threatening to ruin his operations should he try to recover Mei. Luke makes multiple copies of the disc and stores them in bank safe deposit boxes throughout the city as his security to ensure that no one can come after him or Mei again without risking being exposed.

Luke decides to leave New York and head to Seattle, where Mei can enroll in a school for gifted children. When she asks if they are finally safe, he responds that they will take it one day at a time.

== Cast ==
- Jason Statham as Luke Wright, an ex-NYPD cop, MMA fighter, and secretly a government assassin.
- Catherine Chan as Mei, a young Chinese math prodigy.
- Robert John Burke as Captain Wolf, a corrupt NYPD captain who is a former colleague of Luke Wright.
- Chris Sarandon as Mayor Tremello, the only person who knows the secrets related to Luke Wright.
- Anson Mount as Alex Rosen, a former squad mate of Luke Wright who, like him, is also a government assassin.
- James Hong as Han Jiao, a dragonhead of the Chinese triad in New York City.
- Reggie Lee as Quan Chang, a violent, high-ranking member of the Han Jiao triad.
- Sandor Tecsy as Emile Docheski, the boss of the Russian mafia in New York City and an archenemy of Luke Wright.
- Joseph Sikora as Vassily Docheski, a lieutenant within his father's Russian Mafia.
- Danny Hoch as Julius Borkow, one of Luke Wright's corrupt former NYPD colleagues.
- Matt O'Toole as Detective Lasky.

== Production ==
Safe was announced on May 6, 2010. The film is the first in a three-film distribution deal between IM Global (which also produced and fully financed) and Lionsgate, the other two being Pete Travis' Dredd and Simon West's Protection. Lawrence Bender Productions, Trigger Street Productions, Automatik Entertainment, and 87Eleven Action Design also produced.

On a $30 million budget, principal photography took place from October to December 2010 in Philadelphia and New York City. Filming scenes in Philadelphia on Broad Street was done on the nights and early mornings of November 17, 18, and 19. A class from a Catholic school in downtown Philadelphia was used for a scene depicting a class in China.

In the United States, the film was scheduled to be released on October 28, 2011, and March 2, 2012, but was eventually pushed back to April 27, 2012.

== Reception ==
On review aggregator Rotten Tomatoes, the film holds an approval rating of 59% based on 112 reviews, with an average rating of 5.70/10. The website's critics consensus reads: "While hard-hitting and violently inventive, Safe ultimately proves too formulaic to set itself apart from the action thriller pack -- including some of its star's better films." On Metacritic, the film has a weighted average score of 55 out of 100, based on 25 critics, indicating "mixed or average reviews".

Peter Travers of Rolling Stone said, "the trouble with Safe is that you know where it's going every step of the way". He also added, "Between the fists, kicks, bullets, car chases, and broken tracheae, the movie could have milked the sentiment of that relationship until you puked. But Statham and the scrappy Chan play it hard. The restraint becomes them. Statham is still playing it safe in Safe, but vulnerability is showing through the cracks." Claudia Puig of USA Today gave the film a moderately positive review, saying that "Yakin's slick direction, marked by quick cuts, unstinting energy and a lack of sentimentality, makes the action scenes satisfying," but thought the dialogue was "riddled with clichés."

Robert Abele of the Los Angeles Times scored 3/5 stars, saying, "Yakin gives his star plenty of room to look mean, think fast, drive faster, punch, quip, mow down, and charismatically bond with the most imperiled child character in screen memory." Kim Newman gave 4/5 stars in Empire, describing it as "A rough, exhausting, exhilarating action picture with a payoff which would have delighted Sam Fuller or Howard Hawks".

== See also ==
- Mental calculators in fiction
