= The Ambassador (TV series) =

1998 British TV drama

- Genre: Drama
- Created by: Russell Lewis
- Written by: Hugh Costello; Russell Lewis
- Directed by: Patrick Lau; Ken Grieve; Sydney Macartney
- Starring: Pauline Collins; Denis Lawson
- Composer: Richard Harvey
- Country of origin: United Kingdom
- Original language: English
- No. of series: 2
- No. of episodes: 12

Production
- Running time: 57 minutes
- Production companies: Ecosse Films; Irish Screen

Original release
- Network: BBC One
- Release: 4 January 1998 – 30 May 1999

The Ambassador is a British drama television series produced by the BBC, created by Hugh Costello and it ran for two series between 4 January 1998 and 30 May 1999.

The series starred Pauline Collins in the title role as Harriet Smith, the new British ambassador to Ireland and dealt with the personal and professional pressures in her life, as well as wider political themes. Other notable cast members were Denis Lawson and Peter Egan.

== Cast and characters ==
=== Main ===
- Pauline Collins as Harriet Smith, the British Ambassador to Ireland. Harriet continually tries to maintain the pressures of her personal and private life whilst trying to move on from her guilt regarding the murder of her husband, David, who was killed by a car bomb intended for Harriet.
- Denis Lawson as John Stone, Commercial Attaché for the British Ambassador to Ireland and a clandestine operative for MI6. He is affectionately nicknamed "Spook" by Harriet.

=== Recurring ===
- Owen Roe as Kevin Flaherty, the Irish Minister for External Affairs.
- William Chubb as Stephen Tyler, the Deputy British Ambassador to Ireland.
- Tom Connolly as Sam Smith, the 13-year-old son of Harriet Smith.
- Alison McKenna as Jennifer, Personal Assistant to the British Ambassador (Series 1)
- Sara Markland as Becky (Series 1)
- Dominic Mafham as Julian Wadham (Series 1)
- Tim Matthews as Nate Smith, the 19-year-old son of Harriet Smith and a second-year politics student at Trinity College in Dublin. (Series 1)
- Peter Egan as Michael Cochrane, CEO of Cochrane Construction and Harriet's lover (Series 2)
- Eve Matheson as Catherine Grieve, the Consul General of the British Embassy in Dublin. (Series 2)
- Gina Moxley as Eileen (Series 2)

== Episodes ==
=== Series 1 (1998) ===
No.	Title	Directed by	Written by	Original release date
1	"Innocent Passage"	Patrick Lau	Russell Lewis	4 January 1998
2	"Refuge"	Patrick Lau	Tim Prager	11 January 1998
3	"Nine Tenths of the Law"	Ken Grieve	Christopher Russell	18 January 1998
4	"A Cluster of Betrayals"	Syd Macartney	Tim Prager	25 January 1998
5	"Trade"	Syd Macartney	Julian Jones	1 February 1998
6	"Playing God"	Ken Grieve	Christopher Russell	8 February 1998

=== Series 2 (1999) ===
No.	Title	Directed by	Written by	Original release date
1	"The Road to Nowhere"	Matthew Evans	Julian Jones	18 April 1999
2	"Vacant Possession"	Crispin Reece	Tim Prager	25 April 1999
3	"Cost Price"	Matthew Evans	Neil McKay	9 May 1999
4	"Unholy Alliance"	Crispin Reece	Hugh Costello	16 May 1999
5	"A Matter of Life and Death"	A.J. Quinn	Neil McKay	23 May 1999
6	"Getting Away with Murder"	A.J. Quinn	Julian Jones	30 May 1999
