= Michael David Weiss =

American lawyer

- Born: December 7, 1967; Cleveland, Ohio
- Died: October 2, 1999 (aged 31)
- Occupation: Lawyer

Michael David Weiss (December 7, 1967 – October 2, 1999) was an American lawyer. He began a class-action lawsuit against hospital syringe distributors in America, in the hope of protecting nurses from accidental syringe sticks.

== Early life and education ==
Michael Weiss was born in Cleveland, Ohio, the son of lawyer Leon and recruiting company founder Marilou. He has one sibling, brother Daniel. The family moved to Bellaire, Texas, in the Greater Houston metropolitan-area, when Weiss was young.

Weiss graduated from Bellaire High School in 1985, where he got to know his future law partner, Paul Danziger, who graduated the year before. They participated together in school debates, where Weiss was the team's captain. Weiss was a national merit scholarship semi-finalist.

Weiss studied philosophy for two years at Harvard University, then attended the University of Texas School of Law, where he also served as an editor for the Texas Law Review, a student law journal. He graduated from the University of Texas in 1993, with special honors in philosophy and a J.D. degree.

== Career and social involvement ==
Following his graduation, Weiss clerked for Judge Edith Jones of the Fifth Circuit Court of Appeals. He also worked with two different law firms. He subsequently co-founded the firm Lawson, Weiss & Danziger, alongside his schoolfriend Paul Danziger. During that time, Weiss worked on different political causes and with various people such as Bruce Hotze and Councilman Rob Todd. He also represented a number of clients in commercial and employment law cases. Together with his associates, Weiss co-chaired two successful whistleblower cases.

Weiss also taught as an assistant professor at the University of Houston Law School and South Texas College of Law. He was a Senior Fellow of the Texas Public Policy Foundation, Distinguished Fellow of the Texas Justice Foundation, and a member of the Houston City Club.

In 1998, Mike Weiss and Paul Danzinger were approached by inventor Thomas J. Shaw, who had trouble selling an auto-retractable and single-use syringe (Safety Syringe) because Premier, Inc. and Novation, two largest healthcare group purchasing organizations (GPOs) in the United States, refused to adopt his new, more expensive, safer syringes. The inventor turned his hope toward Mike Weiss and Paul Danziger with those issues. Together, Weiss and Danziger brought a lawsuit against the GPOs, but the case never went to trial. In 2002, lawyer Mark Lanier helped Shaw settle with the two GPOs and, in 2004, settled for $100 million (equivalent to $170 million in 2025) with Becton, Dickinson and Company, the largest manufacturer of medical syringes.

== Death ==
Weiss died at the age of 31 on October 2, 1999. Weiss' memorial service was held at The United States Court of Appeals Fifth Circuit Ceremonial Courtroom. The official cause of his death is from a drug overdose. The authorities did not pursue further investigation.

== In popular culture ==
Chris Evans starred as Weiss in the 2011 feature film Puncture.
