= Fanboys (film) =

2009 film by Kyle Newman

- Theatrical release poster
- Directed by: Kyle Newman
- Screenplay by: Ernest Cline; Adam F. Goldberg
- Story by: Ernest Cline; Dan Pulick
- Produced by: Dana Brunetti; Kevin Spacey; Matthew Pernicaro; Evan Astrowsky
- Starring: Jay Baruchel; Dan Fogler; Sam Huntington; Christopher Marquette; Kristen Bell
- Cinematography: Lukas Ettlin
- Edited by: James Thomas; Seth Flaum
- Music by: Mark Mothersbaugh
- Production companies: Trigger Street Productions; Coalition Film
- Distributed by: The Weinstein Company
- Release date: February 6, 2009
- Running time: 90 minutes
- Country: United States
- Language: English
- Box office: $960,828

Fanboys is a 2009 American comedy film directed by Kyle Newman, and starring Dan Fogler, Jay Baruchel, Sam Huntington, Chris Marquette, and Kristen Bell. The story follows a group of Star Wars fans who head on a road trip to Skywalker Ranch to steal a rough cut of Star Wars: Episode I – The Phantom Menace (1999) for their dying friend. The Weinstein Company released it in the United States on February 6, 2009.

Metacritic assessed the critical reception as "mixed". Rotten Tomatoes, another aggregator, said it received negative reviews and called it "undercooked [and] sporadically funny".

== Plot ==
In 1998, Eric Bottler reunites with his old high school buddies Linus, Hutch, Windows, and Zoe at a Halloween party. Now a car salesman at his father's dealership, Bottler finds that his friends have not matured since high school, though they all still share a love of Star Wars. The gang anticipates the latest film, Episode I: The Phantom Menace. Linus proposes Bottler and he infiltrate Skywalker Ranch and steal a rough cut of the film, a childhood plan that Bottler dismisses.

The next day, Hutch and Windows meet Bottler at work and inform him that Linus is dying from cancer. The doctors estimate he has roughly four months to live; Episode I comes out in six. To make peace with his former best friend, Bottler decides to go through with their plan. On the way to meet Rogue Leader, Windows' online girlfriend, for information on getting into the Ranch, Hutch takes a detour to pick a fight with a Trekkie, Admiral Seasholtz. When the boys' van breaks down, they stumble upon a gay biker bar. After refusing to pay for their drinks, they are forced to do a striptease. When this goes wrong, they are saved by a man named "The Chief", who fixes their van after they pass out from eating guacamole laced with peyote. He gives a bag of this to Linus as a parting gift.

In Texas, Windows is horrified to find Rogue Leader is a 10-year-old girl. Her uncle, Harry Knowles, beats up Windows. After explaining their situation, Harry quizzes them to prove they are true fanboys, then gives them information on one of his contacts in Las Vegas. On their way there, they are arrested for fleeing from a police vehicle and for possession of peyote. Zoe arrives to bail them out and insists on accompanying them. Bottler is reluctant to continue when the judge relays an ultimatum from his father, but the others convince him of the importance of their quest. Once in Las Vegas, Hutch and Windows attempt to have sex with women while Bottler and Linus go to meet Harry's contact. They are shocked to find that his contact is William Shatner. As they leave, they are attacked by Seasholtz and his Trekkie friends, who were attending a Star Trek convention. Hutch and Windows flee an angry pimp after finding out that they were with escort girls, and Windows learns that Zoe is in love with him.

The group escapes their adversaries, but Linus is injured in the process. When taken to the hospital, a doctor says he must return home for the sake of his health. When the group feels the situation has become hopeless, Bottler inspires them to continue, reminding them how much Star Wars means to them. The group leaves the hospital and eventually arrive at Skywalker Ranch. Shortly after breaking into the ranch and marveling at the collection of original props and costumes, they are discovered by security guards and are caught after a brief chase. The Head of Security tells them of their impending doom when he receives a phone call from George Lucas himself. Lucas says he will drop all charges if they can prove to him that they are "fanboys". The five are individually quizzed, including questions about the opposite sex that only Zoe can answer. After the Head of Security confirms they are fanboys, Lucas drops all charges. Being aware of Linus's illness, Lucas allows him to watch the film alone while his friends wait outside. After the film ends, Bottler joins his friends around a campfire and mends his friendship with Linus. Weeks later, Linus dies of his illness.

Bottler, Windows, and Zoe emerge from their tent while waiting in line for the premiere of Episode I. Bottler has followed his and Linus's dream by becoming a comic book artist, Hutch has started his own detailing business, and Windows and Zoe are dating. Hutch arrives at the theater with beers he smuggled in, which they use to toast Linus's memory. Before the film starts, Bottler comments "What if the movie sucks?"

== Cast ==
- Jay Baruchel as Windows
- Dan Fogler as Harold "Hutch" Hutchinson
- Sam Huntington as Eric Bottler
- Chris Marquette as Linus
- Kristen Bell as Zoe
- David Denman as Chaz
- Christopher McDonald as Chuck "Big Chuck" Bottler, Eric and Chaz's father.
- Billy Dee Williams as Judge Reinhold
- Danny Trejo as The Chief
- Allie Grant as Rogue Leader / Kimmy
- Ethan Suplee as Harry Knowles
- Seth Rogen as Admiral Seasholtz / Alien / Roach
- Isaac Kappy as Garfunkel

There are numerous cameos related to Star Wars and other science-fiction/cult-hit films including Carrie Fisher, Jason Mewes, Kevin Smith, Jaime King, Danny McBride, Ray Park, Craig Robinson, Joe Lo Truglio, Lou Taylor Pucci, Will Forte and William Shatner.

== Production ==
=== Development ===
After George Lucas was given an advance screening of the rough cut of the film, he enjoyed it and gave it his "stamp of approval", and even offered the original Star Wars sound effects for use in the film. Filmmaker and Star Wars fan Kevin Smith also viewed an early version of the film and asked for (and was given) a cameo in the film.

The film was originally to be released on August 17, 2007 by Metro-Goldwyn-Mayer. The film was pushed back once more to January 2008 because director Kyle Newman was given more funding to shoot additional scenes that the original budget did not include. Getting the cast back together would only be possible in September 2007, thus the film's release date had to be moved to 2008.

The film was again pushed back because the reshoots could not take place before November and December 2007. These reshoots were directed by Steven Brill and not by Newman. On January 14, The CineManiac reported that the film was being re-edited to remove the cancer plot from the film and replace much of it with raunchy, vulgar humor. Ain't It Cool News picked up the story and confirmed that the two different versions of the film (with and without the cancer subplot) were screened to different test audiences in Burbank, California in January 2008 to see which one would rate higher. As for a new release date, Newman stated in a Movie Geeks United! interview that the film would hopefully come out in April 2008. Upon hearing about the changes being made to the film, an internet campaign was begun to protest the plot changes and demand that the original version with the cancer storyline be released in theaters.

Brill retaliated in a derogatory manner, calling fans "losers" in online correspondence which ended up released to the public. In one exchange, Brill called a fan "dumb" and threatened to "hunt him down" in a profanity-laden emailed response to a letter of complaint. In an interview Newman chastised Brill's behavior, saying:

If you're going to go in and recut someone's film even though you're not even a fan of the subject matter, just because you want a paycheck, you're not passionate about it, then do that. But don't go opening your mouth and alienating the core audience of that movie. I just thought that was the most low class thing that you could do, especially considering there are so many people that worked years and years and years on this.

A rough cut of the full film (that included the cancer storyline) was shown in public for the first time at Star Wars Celebration Europe on July 14, 2007.

On July 9, 2008, Newman confirmed in a TheForce.net interview that the cancer plot would be included in the final cut of the film.

The motivation was stripped [out] of the movie so it was more like, 'Hey, we're drunk. You wanna go break into Skywalker ranch?' It ultimately didn't work and that's why it, I think, came back to us, the original team to at least restore it as much as we could in the time given."

Newman was given just 36 hours to reassemble his film, and edit back in the key motivational cancer plotline.

The final cut of the film was screened on July 24, 2008 at San Diego Comic-Con. It was announced there that Fanboys would be released to theaters on September 19, 2008, but soon after, the official Weinstein Company website announced that this had changed to November 26, 2008. The final release date was finally pushed to February 6, 2009.

The Telegraph included the film in its list "Harvey Scissorhands: 6 films ruined by Harvey Weinstein".

=== Retrospective ===
In a 2018 oral history of the film, members of the cast recalled feeling frustrated over the film's reshoots, as well as the behavior of producer Harvey Weinstein and reshoot director Steve Brill during filming. Cline and Newman noted several of the raunchier scenes written by Adam F. Goldberg at Weinstein's request remained in the final cut, including the scene at the gay bar, which Cline found homophobic even by the standards of when the film was released.

The cast and creatives voiced interest in making a sequel to Fanboys, but Cline noted its attachment to Weinstein, Spacey, and Knowles (who had all since been accused of sexual assault) made this unlikely. Cline also expressed interest in a directors' cut of the film that reflected his and Newman's original vision.

On January 17, 2021 members of the Fanboys cast and crew had an online reunion-panel, as part of Dan Fogler's "Fogler's Fiction Fest" presented by Nerdbot. Director Kyle Newman, Jay Baruchel, Dan Fogler, Adam F. Goldberg, Chris Marquette and Sam Huntington were the ones present for the panel. During the event, cast and creatives once again expressed interest in a making a sequel.

== Release ==
=== Theatrical run and box office ===
Fanboys was released on February 6, 2009 in eight US markets. The film expanded into 10 more cities on February 20, 2009, including a special screening in Columbus, Ohio that day, followed by a Q&A session after the film with Kyle Newman, Ernie Cline, Matt Perniciaro and Kevin Mann. According to Cline's pre-show speech, he wanted to hold a special screening with fans in his home state, since he grew up in nearby Ashland, Ohio, and the story was set in a fictional town of Shandal, Ohio, similar to Ashland (Shandal is an anagram of Ashland). The film expanded its release to seven more markets on February 27, 2009, to 13 more on March 13, 2009, and an additional 9 on March 20, 2009. On April 3, 2009, it was released in Canadian theaters. The film was also released on May 7, 2009 in Denmark and showed for approximately three weeks, it was released in Germany on July 30, 2009.

=== Home media ===
The DVD was released on May 19, 2009, the day of the 10th anniversary of The Phantom Menace. The DVD and Blu-ray were also released in Canada on June 2, 2009.

The region 2 DVD was released on October 4, 2010.

== Reception ==
On Rotten Tomatoes, the film holds an approval rating of 33% based on 95 reviews and an average rating of 4.8/10. The site's consensus reads, "This undercooked, sporadically funny road movie is a sop to Star Wars fanatics, but the uninitiated will find little to enjoy." On Metacritic, the film has a rating of 45 out of 100 based on 24 critics, indicating "mixed or average" reviews.

Roger Ebert gave the film 1 1/2 out of 4 stars, calling it "an amiable but disjointed film that identifies too closely with its heroes. Poking a little more fun at them would have been a great idea." James Berardinelli gave it 2 1/2 out of 4 stars, saying it was "mostly a middling road picture that doesn't do a lot more than any average, forgettable entry into the tired genre." Ben Lyons and Ben Mankiewicz of At the Movies recommended to "Skip It". Lyons said, "It was a great premise; it just unfortunately did not come together", and Mankiewicz commented that "it devolves into nothing more than a silly road trip movie."

== See also ==
- List of films set around Halloween
