= The Minor Accomplishments of Jackie Woodman =

American sitcom

- Genre: Sitcom
- Created by: Laura Kightlinger
- Written by: Laura Kightlinger; David Punch
- Directed by: Adam Kassen (2006); Russell Bates (2007); Steve Carr; Jonathan Corn & Mary Kay Place
- Starring: Laura Kightlinger; Nicholle Tom
- Opening theme: "Sourpuss" by Jeff Moris Tepper
- Composer: Randy Lee
- Country of origin: United States
- Original language: English
- No. of seasons: 2
- No. of episodes: 16

Production
- Executive producers: Laura Kightlinger; David Punch; Evan Shapiro
- Running time: 22-28 minutes

Original release
- Network: IFC
- Release: August 4, 2006 – September 23, 2007

The Minor Accomplishments of Jackie Woodman is an American sitcom from World of Wonder Productions, co-written, executive produced by and starring Laura Kightlinger. The series premiered on IFC August 4, 2006. Season two began on August 5, 2007 on IFC.

== Characters ==
=== Main characters ===
- Jackie Woodman (Laura Kightlinger), a surly writer for a second rate indie film periodical and aspiring screenwriter. Her refusal to be a part of the superficial world of Hollywood is at odds with her desire to be one of the successful elite.
- Tara Wentzel (Nicholle Tom), Jackie's best friend and an initially low-level employee at a film production company (she is promoted in season two). Sexually promiscuous, she embodies everything about Hollywood that Jackie loathes/loves.

=== Recurring characters ===
- Skyler (Azura Skye), Jackie's editor and a trendy, superficial woman.
- Mitchell (Patrick Bristow), Skyler's sycophantic assistant, who is openly rude to Jackie.
- Bobby Paterniti (Jeremy Kramer), the seasoned and brash producer of the "Cat Demon" franchise at Night Sky.
- Ray (Steven Pierce), a security guard at Tara's production company Night Sky. Pierce also appears as a member of The Platform cult in the pilot.
- Jeanette Woodman (Mary Kay Place), Jackie's passive-aggressive mother. She is first heard in season one over the phone and embodied by a turtle during a peyote hallucination. In season two, she visits Jackie twice, annoying Jackie incessantly in the process.
- Angela Birnbaum (Colleen Camp), Jackie's occasional agent. She is quick to trust, love, and overestimate anyone she comes into contact with.
- Cheryl (Octavia Spencer), a wisecracking security guard at Night Sky.
- Carol Rinaldi (Suzy Nakamura), an executive producer at Night Sky.
- Darryl (Rashaan Nall), Jackie's apartment building handyman and occasional confidant (season one).
- Ken (John Kapelos), Tara's boss at Night Sky (season one).
- Mike Ackerman (Giuseppe Andrews), an aspiring writer who steals Jackie's script (season one).
- Lars Ahlstrom (Hugh Davidson), Tara's misogynistic boss at Night Sky (season two).
- Jim Fig (Jon Kinnally), Jackie's hunky downstairs neighbor who moonlights as a serial killer. He randomly appears throughout season two, usually in passing as Jackie sees him outside. His appearances are followed with non sequitur glimpses of him torturing abductees or disposing of bodies. His motives are never explained or brought to the attention of any character, although Jackie chooses to ignore one of his victims when she accidentally sees him writhing below her kitchen window.

== Episodes ==
All episodes were written by Laura Kightlinger & David Punch.

=== Season 1 (2006) ===
No.	Title	Directed by	Original release date	Prod. code
1	"A Cult Classic"	Adam Kassen	August 4, 2006	101
After their car is rear-ended by 1970s icon Sally Kellerman, Jackie and Tara are drawn into the world of "The Platform," a so-called self-help group spearheaded by a charismatic ex-agent. Tara embraces the "step up" way of life, leaving Jackie convinced it's a cult - but if Jackie is going to save her best friend, she has no choice but to join the cult herself.
2	"Mudlarking"	Adam Kassen	August 11, 2006	102
Jackie meets a graphic novelist with boyfriend potential, Mike (Giuseppe Andrews). She promises to attend his book reading even though she has a much-sought-after party invitation for the latest auteur-du-jour. Will Jackie be able to juggle both or will she miss out at her chance for love? Andy Dick also makes a cameo as himself.
3	"Pounded"	Adam Kassen	August 18, 2006	103
Jackie discovers that Mike, her would-be boyfriend, stole her 1930s roller derby queen script idea and sold it to the production company where Tara works. Adding insult to injury, Jackie takes a job with the production as a writing assistant on her own screenplay, while Tara's love life "blossoms."
4	"Tumor Has It"	Adam Kassen	August 25, 2006	104
Jackie unexpectedly gets elevated to co-writer status, but later finds out she was promoted only because the studio heads believe she has cancer. How far will she go to keep up the charade? Guest starring Suzy Nakamura as Carol Rinaldi.
5	"Turning Manure Into Soy"	Adam Kassen	September 1, 2006	105
Kept awake by a neighbor’s unstopping car alarm, Jackie calls the cops and has the car towed. The next morning, she’s unexpectedly befriended by the car’s eccentric owner, Angela Birnbaum (Colleen Camp), a hotshot agent who decides to take Jackie on as a client.
6	"Peyote Ugly"	Adam Kassen	September 8, 2006	106
Jackie receives a large filmmaking grant from a non-profit Native American organization to make a documentary on the sacred peyote ritual. But within hours, she and Tara spend all the money on overpriced boutique junk. Left without a budget, they are forced to produce and shoot the footage themselves. Featuring a cameo by Annie Mumolo as the boutique clerk.
7	"Nemesisyphus"	Adam Kassen	September 15, 2006	107
Learning that an old enemy from film school (Gabrielle Fitzpatrick) signed an improbable deal to turn a book, on how to write a screenplay, into a movie, Jackie, in utter frustration, turns to the wisdom of Sun Tzu's "The Art of War."
8	"The Republicunt"	Adam Kassen	September 22, 2006	108
Under the influence of a new designer drug, Jackie becomes an obsessive fan of right-wing radio host Ned Carter (Ray Wise). He crowns her “Carter’s Commando of the Week” and invites her to “Abu Ghraib Night.”

=== Season 2 (2007) ===
No.	Title	Directed by	Original release date	Prod. code
9	"Dykes Like Us"	Russell Bates	August 5, 2007	201
Jackie and Tara fake a lesbian dating scheme in order for Tara to get a good deal on a new car, which leads to a much-wanted job opportunity for Jackie at a television network if she can keep up the act. Cameo by Adam DeVine as Toby, a show writer at Jackie's "new" job.
10	"We're Number Two"	Russell Bates	August 12, 2007	202
Jackie's mom Jeanette (Mary Kay Place) comes to town for a visit that coincides with the LA Film Market. Tara is thrust into hosting a panel for Night Sky, while Jackie is scheduled pitch her new screenplay.
11	"Bad Luck Brad"	Steve Carr	August 19, 2007	203
Tara falls for Bobby P's (Jeremy Kramer) bad-luck new assistant and brings Jackie on board to help make phonisodes out of a homemade YouTube cartoon.
12	"Jackie Meets Her Match"	Steve Carr	August 26, 2007	204
Tara meets a millionaire who can't satisfy her (Tuc Watkins) while Jackie meets her male double (Tom Stern), but both have bitten off more than they can chew. Cameo by Patrika Darbo as a card store clerk.
13	"Yoga Brain"	Steve Carr	September 2, 2007	205
Tara takes Jackie to a yoga class, which has a positive impact on her. Cameo by Sally Kellerman reprising her eccentric fictional self and Sam Simon.
14	"The Carolina Moonshiners"	Jonathan Corn	September 9, 2007	206
Jeanette surprises Jackie with a visit, only this time with her new husband (Madison Mason) in tow. He and Jackie instantly butt heads, as she tries to get used to her mother being married again.
15	"Straight Up Your Heart"	Mary Kay Place	September 16, 2007	207
Tara gets a promotion while Jackie attempts writing a commercial love story.
16	"Good Times and Great Oldies"	Mary Kay Place	September 23, 2007	208
Jackie and Tara are stuck at a bar with a very old clientele when the city goes on "red alert". Guest starring Paul Dooley as Major and Orson Bean as Chick, with a cameo by Lee Majors as the governor of Los Angeles.

== Critical reception ==
Dana Gee of The Province rated the show "B", stating that "unlike most sitcoms, there are no morality plays and characters are not given a patina to make them seem a little more interesting."

== Home media ==
Season one was released on DVD on July 17, 2007.

== International broadcast ==
An entire run of the series was screened in the United Kingdom on the now defunct channel, Film 24.
