= Hugh Costello =

Irish writer

Hugh Costello is an Irish writer.

== Career ==
Costello made his name in radio (including The Guest at St Peters, Bail Out, My Dear Children of the Whole World, What The Bishops Knew and Conclave) and television (credits include The Ambassador, Holby City and On Home Ground). He also wrote the short film The Rope Trick as well as the feature Auto de Fe. However, he is best known for writing the critically acclaimed 2007 film Bernard and Doris, which premiered on HBO on 9 February 2008 and was nominated for ten Emmy awards, including Outstanding Writing in a Miniseries.
