= Patricia Harless =

Member of the Texas House of Representatives from the 126th district
- In office January 8, 2007 – January 8, 2017
- Preceded by: Peggy Hamric
- Succeeded by: Kevin Roberts

Personal details
- Born: Patricia Fincher; November 13, 1963 (age 63)
- Party: Republican
- Spouse: Sam Harless (m. 1985)
- Children: 1
- Education: LeTourneau University

Patricia Fincher Harless (born November 13, 1963) is a Texan politician and businesswoman who represented the 126th district in the Texas House of Representatives until 2017.

== Political career ==
Harless was appointed to the Texas Motor Vehicle Board overseeing the Texas Department of Motor Vehicles by Governor George W. Bush and later re-appointed by Governor Rick Perry, serving from 1998 to 2005.

She was elected to the Texas House of Representatives in 2006 for the 126th district as a member of the Republican Party. She was sworn in on January 8, 2007 succeeding Republican Peggy Hamric and was subsequently re-elected four times.

In 2016, she declined to seek re-election and was succeeded by Kevin Roberts.

In 2019, Sam Harless was elected to the Texas House of Representatives for her former district.

== Electoral history ==
=== 2006 ===
Texas General Election, 2006: House District 126
| Party | Candidate | Votes | % |
| Republican | Patricia Harless | 18,112 | 64.77% |
| Democrat | Chad Khan | 9,114 | 32.59% |
| Libertarian | Oscar J. Palma, Jr. | 736 | 2.63% |
| Margin | | 8,998 | 32.18% |

=== 2008 ===
Texas General Election, 2008: House District 126
| Party | Candidate | Votes | % |
| Republican | Patricia Harless (Incumbent) | 32,748 | 59.40% |
| Democrat | Chad Khan | 21,179 | 38.42% |
| Libertarian | Oscar J. Palma, Jr. | 1,204 | 2.18% |
| Margin | | 11,569 | 20.98% |

=== 2010 ===
Texas General Election, 2010: House District 126
| Party | Candidate | Votes | % |
| Republican | Patricia Harless (Incumbent) | 25,534 | 68.14% |
| Democrat | Casey McKinney | 11,938 | 31.86% |
| Margin | | 13,596 | 36.28% |

=== 2012 ===
Texas General Election, 2012: House District 126
| Party | Candidate | Votes | % |
| Republican | Patricia Harless (Incumbent) | 40,311 | 100.00% |
| Margin | | 40,311 | 100.00% |

=== 2014 ===
Texas General Election, 2014: House District 126
| Party | Candidate | Votes | % |
| Republican | Patricia Harless (Incumbent) | 23,899 | 86.31% |
| Libertarian | Cris Hernandez | 3,791 | 13.69% |
| Margin | | 20,108 | 72.62% |

== Personal life ==
Harless married Sam Harless in 1985 and has one child. She co-owns Fred Fincher Motors, a car dealership group founded by her parents in 1959, with her husband and previously served as CFO.
