= Shrink (film) =

2009 film directed by Jonas Pate

- Promotional film poster
- Directed by: Jonas Pate
- Written by: Thomas Moffett
- Produced by: Braxton Pope; Dana Brunetti
- Starring: Kevin Spacey; Saffron Burrows; Keke Palmer; Mark Webber; Pell James; Robin Williams
- Cinematography: Lukas Ettlin
- Edited by: Luis Carballar
- Music by: Brian Reitzell; Ken Andrews
- Production companies: Ignite Entertainment; Trigger Street Productions
- Distributed by: Roadside Attractions (United States); Mandate Pictures (International)
- Release date: July 24, 2009
- Running time: 104 minutes (US); 110 minutes (Germany)
- Country: United States
- Language: English
- Box office: $303,431

Shrink is a 2009 American independent black comedy-drama film about a psychiatrist who treats members of the entertainment industry in Los Angeles, California. It is directed by Jonas Pate, written by Thomas Moffett, and stars Kevin Spacey with an ensemble cast. The film premiered at the 2009 Sundance Film Festival and includes music by Jackson Browne. Shrink received negative reviews from critics, praising Spacey's performance but critical of the film's scripting and directing.

== Plot ==
In Hollywood, psychiatrist Dr. Henry Carter treats mostly luminaries in the film industry, each undergoing their own life crisis. Carter lives in a large, luxurious house overlooking the Hollywood Hills and has published a hugely successful self-help book. However, he is disheveled and lives alone. He smokes marijuana at home, in his car and behind his office when not seeing patients. Carter routinely drinks himself to sleep around his house, waking up in his clothes, but never enters his bedroom. Despite his own problems, Carter continues psychotherapy with his patients, maintaining his incisiveness, compassion and strong doctor-patient relationships.

Focusing on some of Carter's patients, Patrick is a high-powered talent agent who is both narcissistic and angst-ridden, with germ phobia. Seamus is an actor addicted to various drugs and alcohol, and one of Patrick's biggest clients. Seamus is not one of Carter's patients, but they share a drug-dealer named Jesus. Jack Holden is another popular celebrity with a drinking problem, about which he is in denial. He continues therapy, however, because he believes that he has a sex addiction. Kate is an actress in her thirties who is intelligent, compassionate and poised, but is facing fewer career opportunities because of Patrick's notion that her age is a limitation. Her rock-star husband, who she says "wasn't always like this", is self-centered and is cheating on her. Carter's newest patient, Jemma, is a troubled high-school student who is required by her school to see a therapist after cutting her hand by punching a mirror. She is referred to Carter by his father as a pro-bono case because, like Carter's wife, Jemma's mother died by suicide. Jemma is an avid moviegoer who aspires to become a filmmaker.

Carter has few friends and spends time with Jesus, his quirky pot dealer. Carter also socializes with Jeremy, to whom he is loosely related through Carter's deceased wife, whose mother was Jeremy's godmother. Jeremy is a struggling young screenwriter who finds romantic interest in Patrick's assistant Daisy. Jeremy also derives creative inspiration from Jemma. Jeremy secretly steals Jemma's private file from Carter's office and pursues a platonic interest in Jemma. He writes his breakthrough screenplay about Jemma, and with Daisy's help, Jeremy succeeds in gaining Patrick's interest in the screenplay.

Carter suffers a breakdown on a live television talk show, alarming the host and the viewers when he states publicly for the first time that his wife died by suicide. He denounces his book as "bullshit" and himself as a fraud, and storms off of the set. Jemma, Daisy and Jeremy react to Carter's on-air outburst. Carter decides to stop treating Jemma, although he begins helping her to finally come to terms with her mother's suicide.

Jemma discovers the screenplay and feels betrayed by Jeremy. Carter angrily attacks Jeremy for his deception but accepts his own professional responsibility for the situation, which he unknowingly enabled. Carter and Jeremy are invited to a meeting at Patrick's office. Patrick brings them to a conference room where Jemma is already waiting. To their surprise, Jemma now approves of Jeremy's screenplay. Patrick announces that he will be representing Jemma and developing Jeremy's screenplay into a movie. Carter, having disposed of his drug supply, approaches Kate at home. He tells her that he does not want to see her anymore, "...professionally", implying his interest in seeing her romantically. She smiles.

That night, Carter enters his bedroom wearing pajamas. He momentarily regards his former marital bed before climbing into it and turning off the light.

== Cast ==
- Kevin Spacey as Dr. Henry Carter
- Saffron Burrows as Kate Amberson
- Keke Palmer as Jemma
- Mark Webber as Jeremy
- Jack Huston as Shamus
- Robert Loggia as Dr. Robert Carter, Henry's Father
- Pell James as Daisy
- Jesse Plemons as Jesus, Carter's Pot Dealer
- Sierra Aylina McClain as Carina
- Dallas Roberts as Patrick
- Ashley Greene as Missy
- Laura Ramsey as Kiera
- Gore Vidal as George Charles
- Joel Gretsch as Evan
- Jillian Armenante as Writer In Patrick's Writer's Room
- Robin Williams as Jack Holden (uncredited)

== Critical reception ==
Shrink received negative reviews from critics. On Rotten Tomatoes, the film holds a 27% approval rating based on 63 reviews, with an average score of 4.6/10. The website's critical consensus reads: "Kevin Spacey's performance is almost sharp enough to save this Hollywood dramedy from itself, but in the end, he's dragged down by a cliched script and indifferent direction." On Metacritic, the film holds a score of 40 out of 100, based on 21 critics, indicating "mixed or average" reviews.

Stephen Holden of The New York Times noted how the film comes across as a "kinder and gentler" contemporary to Joan Didion's novel Play It as It Lays and lacks the "ruthless satiric thrust" of Robert Altman's The Player or the "pungent gallows humor of a Bruce Wagner novel", but gave praise to Spacey for his portrayal of "bone-deep cynicism" in his role, and the "atmospheric cinematography" and "hovering music" for giving the film "a queasy downbeat mood".

Roger Ebert of the Chicago Sun-Times gave praise to Spacey and Palmer's performances as Henry and Jemma, respectively, but felt that the filmmakers sidestepped "deep characterization and bring in a rather conventional assortment of clients for Spacey's shrink" throughout the film, concluding that "Shrink contains ideas for a film, but no emotional center. A group of troubled characters are assembled and allowed to act out, not to much purpose."

Amy Biancolli of the San Francisco Chronicle praised Spacey's performance as the title character, the film's humor and delivery of "a few fine moments of truth and pathos" that address "a subset of grief", but criticized the plot's reliance on "pat betrayal, forced coincidences – and the sort of closure that lands, with a thud, in a tidy package of cliches". She concluded, "Had director Jonas Pate and screenwriter Thomas Moffett limited themselves to the bags under Henry's eyes and the emotional hollow behind them, they might have produced a minor classic."

Marjorie Baumgarten of The Austin Chronicle praised Spacey's "sardonic line delivery" of his role, as well as the appearances of Plemons and Vidal for being "uncharted and fresh" and a "startling surprise", respectively, but criticized the film's "shallow story" with interconnecting characters that strained credibility, concluding, "The film's conclusion is anticlimactic and unsatisfying, but maybe that's a faithful replication of the psychiatric experience: a quiet shutting of the barn door once the horse has already galloped away from the stable."

Peter Howell of the Toronto Star called it "another Tinseltown navel-gazer with even fewer redeeming features".
