= Texas's 126th House of Representatives district =

American legislative district

Texas's 126th State House of Representatives district
Representative
E. Sam Harless; R–Spring
- Demographics: 45.4% White; 16.5% Black; 26.3% Hispanic; 10.9% Asian
- Population (2020) • Voting age: 188,805; 142,610

The 126th district of the Texas House of Representatives contains parts of Harris County. The current representative is E. Sam Harless, who was first elected in 2018. Sarah Smith ran in General Election as a Write In Candidate (Independent) and was defeated by incumbent E. Sam Harless. Sarah Smith though defeated, among all write in candidates nationwide from Presidential write in candidates down to local write in candidates, scored highest number of votes in the nation in 2024 General Election. E. Sam Harless will continue his tenure the next two years.

Harless did not not run for reelection in the November 3, 2026 midterm elections. Republican Stan Stanart was narrowly defeated by Democrat Stefanie Bord.

== Members ==
- Peggy Hamric (until 2007)
- Patricia Harless (2007–2017)
- Kevin Roberts (2017–2019)
- Sam Harless (2019–2027)
- Stefanie Bord (2027–)
