= Stefanie Bord =

American politician

Member-elect of the Texas House of Representatives from the 126th district
- Assuming office January 2027
- Succeeding: Sam Harless

Personal details
- Party: Democratic
- Website: Campaign website

Stefanie Bord is an American politician. A member of the Democratic Party, she is the member-elect for the 126th district of the Texas House of Representatives. She unseated incumbent Republican Sam Harless. She is a former science teacher.
