= W. Mark Lanier =

American lawyer (born 1960)

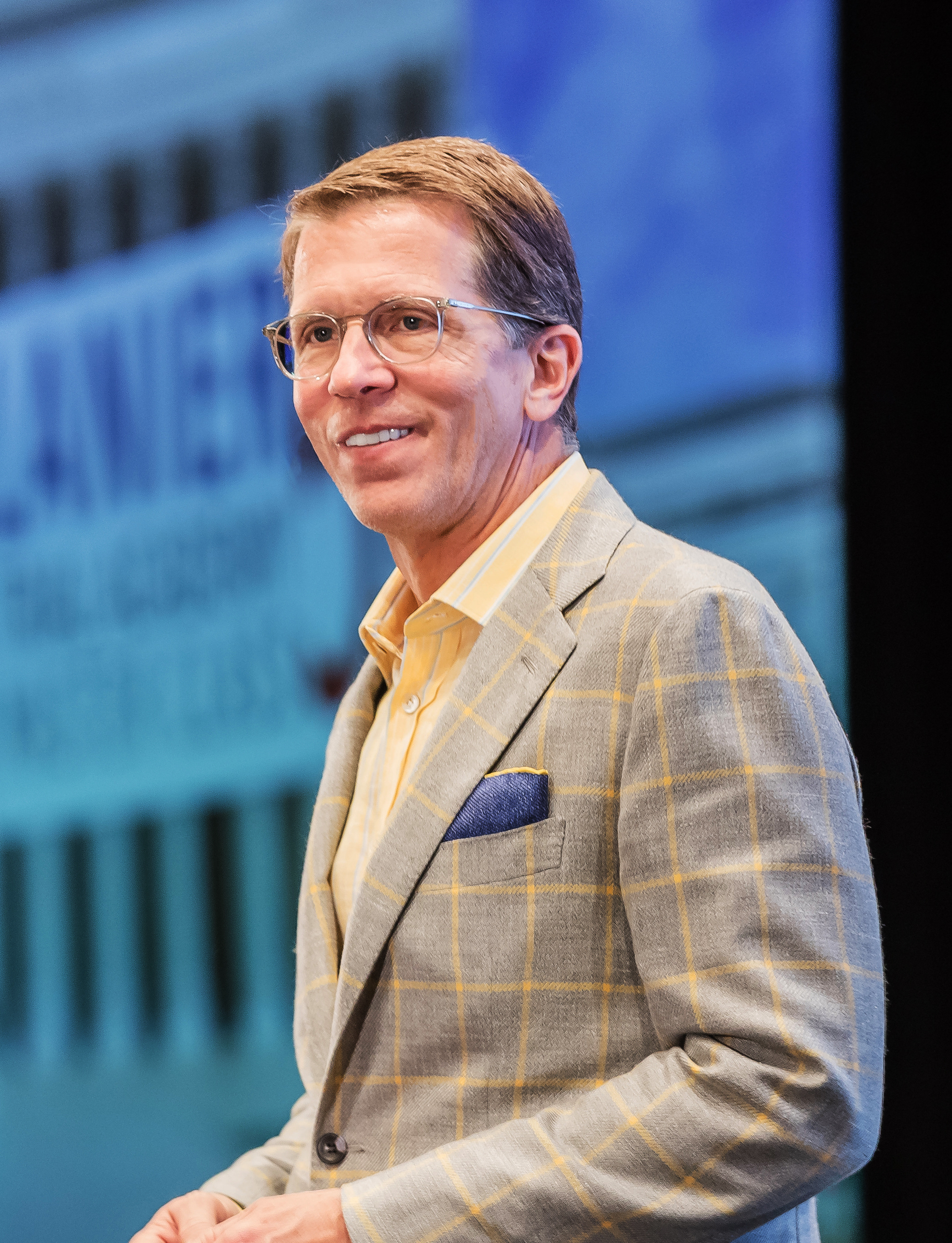
- Lanier in 2021
- Born: William Mark Lanier; October 20, 1960 (age 66); Lubbock, Texas, U.S.
- Education: Lipscomb University (BA); Texas Tech University (JD)
- Occupations: Trial lawyer; Author
- Years active: 1984-present
- Children: 5
- Family: Kevin Roberts (brother-in-law)

William Mark Lanier (born October 20, 1960) is an American trial lawyer, founder of the Lanier Law Firm, philanthropist, Christian author, preacher, and speaker. He has led a number of high-profile product litigation suits resulting in billions of dollars in damages, including those against Johnson & Johnson, Merck & Co., Meta, and YouTube.

== Early life and education ==
Lanier was born on October 20, 1960, in Lubbock, Texas to a railroad salesman and housewife. He graduated from college at 20 years old, having trained as a minister, before going to Texas Tech University School of Law. Lanier graduated from the university in 1984, seeking to use his legal career as supplemental income to support his preaching.

== Legal career ==
Lanier began his legal career working in Houston for Fulbright & Jaworski (now Norton Rose Fulbright), working in the appellate and trial divisions. In 1990, Lanier founded The Lanier Law Firm.

Lanier represented Rubicon Oil and Gas in 1990 in a breach of contract and fraud lawsuit against Amoco. A Matagorda County, Texas jury found that Amoco had wrongly backed out of a contract to sell Wyoming oil fields to Rubicon. The jury verdict totaled $480 million.

In the 1998 trial of Aaron v. Abex, Lanier was the lead counsel for a group of steelworkers who contracted asbestos disease at an Alabama steel mill. The jury verdict was $115 million.

In 2004 Lanier founded the Christian Trial Lawyers Association.

=== Vioxx litigation ===
In 2005, Lanier represented Carol Ernst in a lawsuit against Merck & Co., a pharmaceutical company and manufacturer of Vioxx, an anti-inflammatory drug used to treat osteoarthritis and acute pain conditions. Ernst was married to Robert Ernst, a former marathon runner who died after taking the medication. The case was initially decided in Ernst's favor, with a jury awarding her a $253 million verdict. In another case Lanier obtained consumer fraud findings against Merck who it was claimed had misled doctors and patients by concealing information about Vioxx and its risks. The first ruling was overturned on appeal in 2008 with the court noting Lanier "had not proved that Vioxx caused Mr. Ernst’s death" and compensatory damages were reduced in the second.

=== Johnson & Johnson ===
==== Artificial hip litigation ====
Following the 2010 DePuy Hip Recall, Lanier represented plaintiffs in several lawsuits against Johnson & Johnson and DePuy Synthes, which Johnson & Johnson acquired in 1998. The implants were said to cause a build-up of metal ions in the blood, causing groin pain, allergic reactions, bone erosion and tissue death. The verdict included $140 million in total compensatory damages and about $360 million in punitive damages. The jury ruled that the implants were defectively designed and that the companies failed to warn the public about their risks.

In March 2016, five North Texas residents represented by Lanier were awarded about $500 million for alleged complications arising from the hip implants. The award was later reduced to $151 million at appeal. In November 2016, Lanier won a $1 billion payout to six California-based plaintiffs affected by the implants, followed by a further $247 million to six New York residents in November 2017, where a panel awarded a total of $79 million in actual damages and $168 million in punitive damages against Johnson & Johnson.

In April 2018, a retrial was ordered by the 5th Circuit court of appeals in the case against DePuy Orthopaedics, with the appeal judges accusing Lanier of "inflammatory tactics" in the trial. Reuters reported that the ruling criticized Lanier's actions at the trial. Lanier had told jurors that in contrast to DePuy's expert witnesses in the case, his expert witnesses were unpaid when in fact they were compensated $65,000 after the trial. Lanier disputed this, indicating that he had disclosed the post-trial payments to the defendants. Lanier also insinuated that DePuy were liable because they had been accused of bribing officials from Saddam Hussein's Iraqi regime and claimed that executives at DePuy were racist. The case was the second bellwether trial in multidistrict litigation involving more than 9,000 similar lawsuits consolidated in the U.S. District Court for the Northern District of Texas. The retrial began in January 2019 and in May of that year, Reuters reported that Johnson & Johnson had reached an agreement to settle 95% of the 6,000 cases for $1 billion.

==== Talc litigation ====
In 2018, Lanier led the trial team representing 22 women who had filed suit against Johnson & Johnson. The lawsuit alleged that the company's talcum powder products contained asbestos and that, after several years of use, had caused each of the women's ovarian cancer. The trial lasted six weeks and resulted in $550 million in compensatory damages and $4.14 billion in punitive damages being awarded to the plaintiffs.

Johnson & Johnson appealed the jury verdict in June 2020, and the Eastern District Court of Appeals of Missouri upheld $2.11 billion of the $4.69 billion jury verdict. The opinion stated that Johnson & Johnson had been aware of the potential asbestos contamination for several decades. On June 1, 2021, the Supreme Court of the United States denied a request by Johnson & Johnson to overturn the $2.11 billion verdict.

=== Remington Rifle litigation ===
In July 2018, a federal appeals panel approved a settlement for owners of the Remington Model 700 bolt-action rifle represented by Lanier and The Lanier Law Firm in class action litigation related to design defects that caused the rifle to fire without the trigger being pulled. The settlement provided for millions of rifles to be retrofitted with new trigger mechanisms.

=== BP energy royalty litigation ===
In October 2018, Lanier and The Lanier Law Firm reached a $221 million settlement with BP LLC after representing a class of more than 1,000 Oklahoma natural gas well royalty owners who alleged that BP had underpaid royalties by deducting processing costs and post-production midstream services.

=== Opioids ===
In late 2019, Lanier represented Summit and Cuyahoga counties in the first trial against pharmaceutical companies for damages caused by the distribution of addictive opioid painkillers. The defendants included distributors McKesson Corporation, Cardinal Health, AmerisourceBergen, Walgreens and Teva Pharmaceuticals. The lawsuit claimed that the drug distributors failed to monitor sales as required by federal law and report suspicious activity, which contributed to opioid addictions. Hours before the start of a trial, three pharmaceutical distributors and a manufacturer reached a settlement $260 million to resolve litigation over damages caused by the opioid epidemic.

Lanier also represented Trumbull and Lake counties against retail pharmacies for excessive distribution of addictive opioid painkillers. The lawsuit alleged that pharmacies operated by CVS Health, Walgreens, and Walmart created a public nuisance through the over-prescription of pain medication in those communities which contributed to hundreds of overdose deaths. The trial lasted six weeks with the jury returning a verdict finding the Ohio pharmacies liable. It was the first trial where pharmacy companies defended themselves amidst the opioid epidemic, and Lanier indicated the counties were seeking $1 billion.

=== Google antitrust litigation ===
In December 2020, Lanier and The Lanier Law Firm were hired by Texas Attorney General Ken Paxton to represent the state of Texas in antitrust litigation brought against Google parent company, Alphabet Inc. Texas was leading a coalition of state attorneys general in claims that Google's dominant position in digital advertising created an unfair competitive advantage.

=== EpiPen MDL ===
Lanier was the lead trial lawyer representing EpiPen buyers accusing Pfizer and Mylan of illegally inflating prices of the EpiPen emergency treatment for allergic reactions. In January 2021, Lanier was appointed to the plaintiff steering committee for multidistrict litigation. More than 40 lawsuits consolidated in New Jersey federal court charge that Johnson & Johnson's pharmaceutical unit concealed harmful side effects of the Elmiron bladder cyst medication, resulting in serious eye damage.

=== Social media addiction litigation ===
In 2026, Lanier was lead trial counsel for a trial against Meta and Google concerning claims that their social media and streaming platforms caused or worsened depression, anxiety and body dysmorphia in minors, including allegations that the platforms were addictive. The plaintiff, a young woman identified by her initials, alleged that she became addicted to Instagram and YouTube as a child and that the addiction worsened her mental health. Lanier and his team focused on the features of the platforms rather than content found on them while making the case, avoiding Section 230 of the 1996 Communications Decency Act, which social-media companies have used to avoid being held liable for third-party content on their platforms. Snap and TikTok settled before trial.

In March 2026, after nine days of deliberation, a jury found that Meta and YouTube were negligent “in a case that accused the companies of designing their apps to be addictive and harmful to teens”. Meta and YouTube’s parent company, Google, were ordered to pay $3 million in compensatory damages and $3 million in punitive damages to the plaintiff, apportioning 70% of the payment to Meta and 30% to Google. Lanier tried the case with his daughters, Rachel Lanier, managing attorney of the firm’s Los Angeles office, and Sarah Lanier, along with Rahul Ravipudi, a lawyer outside of Lanier’s firm. In June 2026, Los Angeles Superior Court Judge Carolyn Kuhl denied the defendants’ post-trial motions, and both companies appealed the following month.

Subsequent media coverage described Lanier’s use of artificial intelligence tools during the trial to assist with trial preparation, transcript review, and evaluation of jury questions. Business Insider reported that Lanier described the technology as subject to attorney oversight rather than a substitute for legal research or brief writing.

== Bibliography ==
- Lanier, W. Mark (23 May 2014). Christianity on Trial: A Trial Lawyer Examines the Christian Faith. InterVarsity Press. ISBN 978-0830836673.
- Lanier, W. Mark (15 June 2017). Psalms for Living: Daily Prayers, Wisdom, and Guidance. Baylor University Press. ISBN 978-1481308069.
- Lanier, W. Mark (1 December 2018). Torah for Living: Daily Prayers, Wisdom, and Guidance. Baylor University Press. ISBN 978-1481309820.
- Lanier, W. Mark (25 January 2022). Atheism on Trial: A Lawyer Examines the Case for Unbelief. InterVarsity Press. ISBN 978-1514002278.
- Lanier, W. Mark (3 January 2023). Religions on Trial: A Lawyer Examines Buddhism, Hinduism, Islam, and More. InterVarsity Press. ISBN 978-1514003435.
- Lanier, W. Mark (15 December 2023). Minor Prophets for Living: Daily Prayers, Wisdom, and Guidance. Baylor University Press. ISBN 978-1481320993.
- Lanier, W. Mark (2024). New Testament Letters for Living: Daily Prayers, Wisdom, and Guidance. Baylor University Press. ISBN 978-1481322515.

== Personal life ==
Lanier met his wife, Becky, in high school debate class. They have five children and twelve grandchildren. Three of Lanier’s children are lawyers. His brother-in-law is former Texas state representative Kevin Roberts, who ran against Dan Crenshaw in the 2018 Republican primary to replace retiring Congressman Ted Poe. During the campaign, Lanier funded a super PAC which ran ads against Crenshaw.

Lanier appears in the documentary film A Lawyer Walks into a Bar, and in the 2011 film Puncture, where he plays a character with the same name.

In addition to his trial work, Lanier teaches a Sunday Bible class at a Houston church.

=== Philanthropy ===
Through the Lanier Foundation, Lanier and his wife have donated to various legal-adjacent and Christian causes in the Houston area and domestically, including the establishment of the Lanier Theological Library, a donation for the Mark and Becky Lanier Professional Development Center at the Texas Tech School of Law, and the funding of the Lanier Center for Archaeology at Lipscomb University.

==== Lanier Theological Library and Learning Center ====
In 2010, Lanier established the Lanier Theological Library and Learning Center in Houston, Texas. The library is a private theological research library with private collections which include Chaim Cohen, Alan Crown, Abraham Malamat, and Randall Price. The library also hosts lectures by theological speakers.
