= Bernard and Doris =

2006 television film directed by Bob Balaban

- Advertisement for the HBO broadcast
- Directed by: Bob Balaban
- Written by: Hugh Costello
- Produced by: Bob Balaban; Dana Brunetti; Jonathan Cavendish; Adam Kassen; Mark Kassen; C. Cory M. McCrum-Abdo; Mark Olsen; Kevin Spacey; Glen Trotiner
- Starring: Susan Sarandon; Ralph Fiennes
- Cinematography: Mauricio Rubinstein
- Edited by: Andy Keir
- Music by: Alex Wurman
- Distributed by: HBO Films
- Release date: September 2006 (Toronto International Film Festival)
- Running time: 103 minutes
- Countries: United Kingdom; United States
- Language: English

Bernard and Doris is a 2006 film directed by Bob Balaban. The teleplay by Hugh Costello is a semi-fictionalized account of the relationship that developed between socialite heiress and philanthropist Doris Duke and her self-destructive Irish butler Bernard Lafferty later in her life.

The film premiered at the Hamptons International Film Festival on October 17, 2007 and was broadcast by HBO on February 9, 2008. It has been released on DVD.

== Plot ==
In 1987, Doris Duke, considered the wealthiest woman in the world, hires Bernard Lafferty, who lists Elizabeth Taylor and Peggy Lee as former employers on his résumé, as her majordomo. He explains a six-month gap in his employment history was due to "health issues," a euphemism for time spent in rehab to deal with his addiction to alcohol. He assures Doris, who immediately suspects the truth, he is capable of performing his duties without any problems. As Bernard moves in, the viewer can quickly tell he is a little neurotic, first putting portraits of his former employers, Taylor and Lee, in his bedroom, then informing the rest of the staff he is now "Miss Duke's eyes and ears" and demanding they listen to him. Despite Bernard's growing affection for Doris, the brash and often crude Doris thinks little of him, not even remembering how to correctly pronounce his name. However, their situation slowly evolves into a more emotionally intimate but non-physical relationship as Doris returns from a plastic surgery center one evening, drunk and on painkillers, and is aided by Bernard who stays with her through the night.

Doris teaches Bernard about horticulture, especially the care of orchids, and he takes control of the operation of her various households during her frequent long absences. Bernard himself enjoys tending the home and making sure things are in their correct order. The first time his sexuality is questioned is when he peers at Doris's much younger lover playing the piano in his underwear. In the greenhouse, Doris flirts with him, telling him belly dancing is a form of seduction and then performing a dance for him. Bernard tentatively informs her that he "swings in the other direction." Doris encourages him to tone down his severe dress and wear brighter colors. Doris begins to take Bernard with her on her world tours and convinces him to pierce his ear. During this time, they grow closer, and Doris begins to favor him above everyone else. Also, whenever Doris is mentioned in newspapers, we see Bernard cutting them out of the newspapers and keeping them for himself.

Doris begins to spend more time with Bernard, and at one point attempts to seduce him. When Bernard backs away, Doris questions him: "I don't get it. You don't fuck me, you don't steal from me. So what do you want from me?", to which Bernard answers, "I want to take care of you, Miss Duke."

As the two become closer, and Bernard becomes more relaxed, he begins to drink again, initially with discretion but eventually to an extent that it begins to hinder his performance. Rather than dismiss him, as she always has done with employees who displeased her in the past, Doris has him committed for more rehab at her expense despite his having consumed large amounts of her expensive, vintage wines. Doris suffers a stroke, and Bernard returns to take full control of her life. In order to humor her—and to indulge his own proclivities—Bernard wears her makeup, jewelry, and haute couture and begins to affect a more feminine demeanor. One evening, Doris tells Bernard what she wants him to do after she dies, and a tearful Bernard promises he will perform her requests. Doris's smile fades and she tells him, "I must really be crazy to believe a fucker like you," suggesting that she still resents him for stealing from her.

Meanwhile, Bernard tries to keep Doris' attorney and financial advisor Waldo Taft, away from Doris, hanging up on him whenever he calls. Taft dislikes and distrusts Lafferty enough to have offered him $500,000 to leave his position in the past. Taft calls the police to Doris's estate, but Doris tells the police officer that Bernard is only "peacefully devoted above and beyond in the call of duty," prompting the officer to leave and blame Taft for being jealous. However, Taft encourages Doris to hire a live-in nurse. Although Doris's faith and trust in Bernard cannot be shaken, she agrees to hire a nurse, which Bernard is very unhappy about. Eventually, he convinces her to refrain from hiring a nurse, instead taking care of her himself and only occasionally inviting a doctor to give her checkups.

A while later, Bernard gives a very sick Doris her medicine and injection before putting her to bed, and she dies that night in 1993. Before her death, however, she appoints him executor of her massive estate. In his first meeting with her board of directors following Doris's cremation, a now obviously effete Bernard appears confident and in control, dressed in a style and acting in a manner that is peculiarly similar to Doris's at the beginning of the film. As he waters the orchids in her garden, viewers are told that there were accusations against him that he murdered Doris but that no evidence was found. Viewers are then told that he died from complications related to his alcoholism three years later.

== Cast ==
- Susan Sarandon as Doris Duke
- Ralph Fiennes as Bernard Lafferty
- Peter Asher as First Butler
- Donald Patrick Harvey (credited as Don Harvey) as Security Guard
- Chris Bauer as Chef
- Monique Gabriela Curnen as Paloma
- Marilyn Torres as Nancy
- Nick Rolfe as Ben
- James Rebhorn as Waldo Taft
- Dominick Dunne, Thomas J. McGrath, Gene Parseghian, Henry Schleiff, Calvin Trillin as Board Members
- Kunnath P. Namboodiri as Swami
- David Kuhn, Neal Huff as Dinner Guests
- James Bracchitta as Patrolman
- Robert Penotti as Masseur
- Bruce MacVittie as Doctor
- Ed Onipede Blunt as Second Officer

== Production ==
Old Westbury Gardens served as the setting for Duke's Hillsborough Township, New Jersey estate known as Duke Farms.

Dominick Dunne and Calvin Trillin are seen briefly in cameo appearances as board members.

== Controversy ==
During the production of Bernard and Doris, Pony Duke and Jason Thomas, the authors of Too Rich: The Family Secrets of Doris Duke (1996), threatened Balaban with a suit for copyright infringement. Thomas contended that Balaban had gone so far as to "invite Pony to the movie's set, so he could say he got the material from Pony in an interview. I told Pony not to go." Balaban, however, denied ever admitting anyone to the set. The basis for Duke's and Thomas' contention was an erroneous entry for Bernard and Doris in the IMDb, which stated that Balaban's film was a "version" of Too Rich. According to the NY Daily News, "Balaban says his movie is quite different from the TV flick (whose makers optioned the book title) and that he had nothing to do with IMDB.com's posting." Bernard and Doris, Balaban explained, was entirely based on public records. Balaban dismissed the threatened suit, saying: "They can do whatever they like, but I'm not going to lose too much sleep over this." (The IMDb listing has since been corrected.)

An earlier miniseries, Too Rich: The Secret Life of Doris Duke, had been aired by CBS in February 1999 to less critical acclaim than the later Balaban film. Based largely on the book The Richest Girl in the World by Stephanie Thomas and a series of Vanity Fair articles by Bob Colacello, it also listed the Duke-Thomas book in the credits.

== Critical reception ==
Ginia Bellafante of The New York Times likened the film to "the most delectable kind of Vanity Fair article, one that doesn’t leave you feeling guilty or venal or vaguely nuts for reveling in the particulars of great wealth even as you are made fully aware of all the isolating negatives."

Peter Travers of Rolling Stone called the film a "stunner of a movie [that's] the hip antidote to multiplex junk such as Mad Money and Meet the Spartans. He added, "All praise to director Bob Balaban, who doesn't miss a beat or a nuance in bringing us in, close as a whisper, to what might have been."

Brian Lowry of Variety called the film "a not-very-compelling two-character piece with showy moments for Susan Sarandon and Ralph Fiennes but not much else to recommend it . . . What the movie does provide is a rare indulgence in long, quiet scenes between the leads, which serve both as a showcase for the actors and a reminder as to how undercooked the script is. For Sarandon, Doris is a slightly less shrewish version of the evil queen she just played in Enchanted, while Fiennes is a model of restraint . . . One can see why HBO would gamble on such a modest pickup based on the names attached. Still, much of what passed privately between employer and servant remains shrouded in mystery, and Bernard and Doris is ultimately unsatisfying in filling those gaps - real, imagined or otherwise."

== Awards and nominations ==
- Golden Globe Award for Best Miniseries or TV Film (nominee)
- Golden Globe Award for Best Actor - Miniseries or TV Film (Ralph Fiennes, nominee)
- Golden Globe Award for Best Actress - Miniseries or TV Film (Susan Sarandon, nominee)
- Primetime Emmy Award for Outstanding Television Movie (nominee)
- Primetime Emmy Award for Outstanding Lead Actor in a Miniseries or Movie (Fiennes, nominee)
- Primetime Emmy Award for Outstanding Lead Actress in a Miniseries or Movie (Sarandon, nominee)
- Primetime Emmy Award for Outstanding Directing for a Miniseries or Movie (Bob Balaban, nominee)
- Primetime Emmy Award for Outstanding Writing for a Miniseries or Movie (Hugh Costello, nominee)
- Primetime Emmy Award for Outstanding Music Composition for a Miniseries, Movie or a Special (Alex Wurman, nominee)
- Primetime Emmy Award for Outstanding Cinematography for a Miniseries or Movie (Mauricio Rubinstein, nominee)
- Primetime Emmy Award for Outstanding Main Title Design (Garson Yu, Synderella Peng, Etsuko Uji, and Edwin Baker, nominees)
- Primetime Emmy Award for Outstanding Costumes in a Miniseries or Movie (Joseph G. Aulisi and Autumn Saville, nominees)
- Primetime Emmy Award for Outstanding Hairstyles in a Miniseries or Movie (Robin Day and Milton Buras, nominees)
- SAG Award for Outstanding Male Actor in a Miniseries or TV Film (Fiennes, nominee)
- SAG Award for Outstanding Female Actor in a Miniseries or TV Film (Sarandon, nominee)
