= St Leonards (band) =

Australian musical group

- Origin: Sydney, Australia
- Genres: Alternative Rock
- Years active: 2009-present
- Members: Shane Fritsch
- Past members: Jeff Doukakis; Daniel Romeo; Adrian Hong; Trent Dobson; Chris Koelma
- Website: stleonardsmusic.com

St Leonards is an alternative rock band established in 2009, now a solo project (Shane Fritsch) from Sydney, Australia. St Leonards' debut album is self-titled St Leonards and was released in 2009. Shane cites The Smashing Pumpkins, Coldplay, Death Cab For Cutie, Ben Harper, Ben Lee, Snow Patrol, Bruce Springsteen, John Lennon, Bob Seger, Deftones and U2 as his musical influences. St Leonards is best known for their songs "Now That We've Grown" and "Best Part of Me", both featured on The CW network TV shows The Vampire Diaries and Beauty & the Beast, respectively.

== History ==
Shane worked with engineer/producer Trent Dobson on Shane’s earlier solo record. The two got back together to start recording what was to be Shane’s second solo record and asked Chris Koelma to come along to some sessions to record bass guitar. When a drummer was needed, Chris mentioned that he knew a good drummer and asked him to come along. The sessions went so well that Shane Fritsch asked Chris Koelma and Jeff Doukakis to join a band as Shane Fritsch always wanted to be in a band, but had not yet found the right people.

Shane was being managed by Ted Gardner at the time. He sent the unfinished recordings to his friend and producer John Wooler in the US. Wooler loved what he heard and wanted to produce the band's album. Shane, Jeff, Chris and Trent then decided to travel to Los Angeles, to record what was to become their self-titled debut album and St Leonards was born.

The band owes its name to its front man and songwriter, Shane Fritsch. He used to live in a small apartment in "St Leonards" suburb, in Sydney, Australia. Most of the songs on the band's self-titled debut album were written by Shane in that apartment. Shane Fritsch reflected back to the writing process and St. Leonards seemed the right choice.

St Leonards has evolved back into a solo project.

== Band members ==
Shane Fritsch – Vocals, Keyboards, Piano, Guitar (2009 – Present Member)

Jeff Doukakis – Drums & Percussion (Past Member 2009 – 2013)

Daniel Romeo – Guitar (Past Member 2010–2013)

Adrian Hong – Keyboards/Bass Guitar (Past Member 2011 – 2013)

Trent Dobson (Ex-Member now Producer)

Chris Koelma - Bass Guitar (Past Member 2009 – 2010)

== St Leonards and American TV Shows ==
On 28 January 2010 the song "Now That We've Grown" was used in The CW network TV show The Vampire Diaries season 1, episode 12 "Unpleasantville".

On 8 November 2012 their song "Best Part of Me" was featured in the US hit TV show Beauty & the Beast season 1, episode 5 "Saturn Returns". The song became the first theme song of the main characters, Vincent (Jay Ryan) and Catherine (Kristin Kreuk).

On 26 December 2013 their song "Best Part of Me" was used in the extended preview of season 4 of VH1's Couple's Therapy.

On 6 February 2014 their song "Best Part Of Me" was used on The CW network TV show The Vampire Diaries season 5, episode 13 "Total Eclipse Of The Heart".

== Albums EPs and Singles ==
"St Leonards"- 2009

"World Alone"- EP 2012

"Fly"- Single 2012 8 November 2012

"Where The Town Lit Up"- 14 March 2013

"Died In You" Single - 4 June 2013

"It’s You" Single - (Re-Release 2 July 2013)

"Like The Start" Single - (Re-Release 11 January 2014)
