= The Sasquatch Gang =

- Theatrical release poster
- Directed by: Tim Skousen
- Written by: Tim Skousen
- Produced by: Craig Anderson; Dana Brunetti; Jeremy Coon; Randy Holleschau; Adam Kassen; Mark Kassen; Kevin Spacey; Daniel Wright
- Starring: Jeremy Sumpter; Justin Long; Joey Kern
- Cinematography: Munn Powell
- Edited by: Tim Skousen; Jeremy Coon
- Music by: John Swihart
- Production company: Madman Films
- Distributed by: Screen Media Pictures
- Release dates: January 2006 (Slamdance Film Festival); November 30, 2007 (United States)
- Running time: 86 minutes
- Country: United States
- Language: English
- Budget: $1.6 million
- Box office: $9,458

The Sasquatch Gang (also known as The Sasquatch Dumpling Gang) is a 2006 American comedy film written and directed by Tim Skousen, who served as first assistant director on Napoleon Dynamite.

The six-week shoot was completed in the summer of 2005. The film premiered in January 2006 at the Slamdance Film Festival, where it won the Audience Award. It was also shown at the HBO US Comedy Arts Festival in Aspen, picking up two awards: Justin Long for Best Actor and Skousen for Best Director. It also showed at the Waterfront Film Festival, New Zealand Film Festival, Sidewalk Film Festival, and Vail Film Festival. The film opened in limited release in the United States on November 30, 2007. The film was released on DVD on March 25, 2008.

With a production budget of US$1.6 million, the film's return from box office sales were a domestic gross of US$9,458. The film had a limited cinema run with only 9 opening theaters and an average 1 week run at each theatre.

== Plot ==
Zerk is a young unemployed man who is indebted to a collection agency for a credit card transaction at a burger place. A collection agency rep is sent to warn him that because he has been ignoring the bank for so long, he only has 10 days to pay his debt or else his car will be repossessed. Zerk must find a way to quickly earn enough to save his car. That evening he robs a video rental store in order to save money for his car but buys beer to celebrate instead. The next day, he has a hangover. He can't stand the music his neighbors are playing. He decides to start a fight with them. After he beats Hobie to ground (a fat boy in the neighborhood,) he hears them talking about the sasquatch, a legend that his small town believes in, Zerk has a great idea: He'll buy ingredients to prepare a fake sasquatch feces! His friend Shirts helps him, and they leave the tracks in the forest that Hobie and his friends are about to visit. Hobie falls onto the fake feces, and they discover the "sasquatch's" scat. Later Hobie and his friends meet Shane, a long-time bully. He starts to make fun of the braces of Sophie, Hobie's friend. Actually, she had her mouth wired by her dentist uncle, so as to lose weight. Sophie, not seeming afraid, tells Shane "How about I kick you in the balls?" This refers to the night Sophie was with Gavin, Hobie's best friend, when Shane tried to kiss Sophie by force, without Gavin realizing it.

Actually, Sophie was working at a video rental store which Zerk would rob, and Hobie went there in order to give the toy. He thought she might be interested in him, so he told her he's into fantastic movies. Sophie doesn't seem interested, so Hobie, heartbroken, leaves the video store and that's exactly when Zerk enters.

Sophie, meeting Gavin earlier than Hobie, is only interested in him, so they go on a date. They go against Shane's gang in a game. Hobie, maddened over the fact that he feels like the third wheel to the newly blossoming couple, shoots his teammate, Sophie. Shane bullies him verbally again and leaves the scene. The three friends celebrate the victory. After a fun night, they find Gavin's car ruined by Shane and his gang. He'd written "Fat Sophie" onto the car, so she leaves the scene, heartbroken. Hobie tells Gavin "It's all your fault, you should've let me stay because I know I'd be the third wheel."

The whole town has been waiting for doctor to tell if the Sasquatch feces is genuine, or not. He finally arrives. They, altogether, go to the forest. Now, Zerk is panicked. He needs to destroy evidence. He arrives at the scene, finding the fake evidence destroyed already. It'd been Hobie, anyway. Because he had been jealous of Gavin, stealing his potential love-interest, ignoring Hobie lately, etc.

Zerk hides behind the same tree, and his noise is heard by the police, who happens to be Shane's uncle. He arrests Zerk for creating fake evidence for the polices, and Doctor leaves the scene; but Gavin and Sophie are busy, talking. So, they don't realize Shane and his gang are still there, too. Shane pushes Sophie, she hits her head, and she faints. Gavin is really angry and finds a woodstick to attack Shane, over Zerk's motivational speech. Shane is no afraid. He starts to give Gavin a serious beatdown with his gang but Hobie is there on time. He can't turn his back to his best friend, anymore. He takes Shane's friends, it's Shane against Gavin again. Maynard returns to the forest to say something, sees his friends Hobie and Gavin in a bad situation, he runs back to call the police for help. In the meanwhile, Shane's gang decides to run away from Hobie, on the road they see the police coming, they call out Shane's name, Shane's now afraid, leaves the scene and it's Gavin's victory. Sophie isn't awake still, so Gavin decides to kiss her before the police arrives. She does wake up.

The police ask Maynard about the scene, Hobie admits that he knocked off his nephew. The police accepts that he's been a brat, and he'll talk to him. By the way, Gavin points to the hair of Hobie, the police ask what it's about. Gavin says that "It'd been Hobie that fell onto the feces in the first place, so you can find the evidence you're looking for in Hobie's hair." Doctor does find some "feces" in Hobie's hair, so he declares it's genuine sasquatch dumpling.

Sophie is then seen without the wires in her mouth, she decided to love herself the way she is. Gavin happily kisses her, Hobie and Maynard start roleplaying as Arthur's knights. Zerk is freed from jail, because the town now believes the sasquatch is real, so he does not have to stay in jail. Zerk is welcomed by Shirts, and the first question he asks is about the money. Shirts tells him that "Our fake sasquatch dumplings are sold for real, but since more people believe the sasquatches exist now, everyone started to sell fake dumplings." Zerk understands that all his "hard work" has been in vain, tries not to cry, and asks Shirts what to do next. One final suggestion by Shirts is that: Zerk joins the car races. If he loses his car in the races, there'll be no car to take from Zerk by the bank's force. If he wins the races, he can pay his debt to the bank. Zerk is overjoyed by this idea, but the movie returns to its very first scene: The red car of Zerk's has a small accident, meaning he's left with no car to give to the bank.

== Cast ==
- Jeremy Sumpter as Gavin Gore
- Justin Long as Ezekiel "Zerk" Wilder
- Joey Kern as Lance "Shirts" Jokum
- Addie Land as Sophie Suchowski
- Hubbel Palmer as Hobie Plumber
- Rob Pinkston as Maynard Keyes
- Michael Mitchell as Shane Bagwell
- Ray Santiago as Crone
- Jeff D'Agostino as Dagan
- Jon Gries as Sheriff Ed Chillcut
- Carl Weathers as Dr. Artimus Snodgrass
- Stephen Tobolowsky as Ernie Dalrymple
- Jon Heder as Laser tag referee
- Lucas Adams as Kid with Dreadlocks (extra)

== Reception ==
On Rotten Tomatoes, the film holds an approval rating of 46% based on 13 reviews, with an average rating of 5.20/10. At Metacritic, the film has a weighted average score of 57 out of 100, based on 5 critics, indicating "mixed or average reviews".
