= Dana Brunetti =

American media executive, film producer and entrepreneur

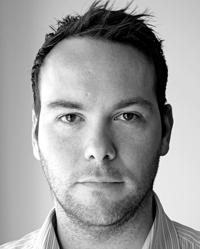
- Brunetti in 2018
- Born: June 11, 1973 (age 53); Clifton Forge, Virginia, U.S.
- Occupations: Film & TV Producer
- Notable work: The Social Network; Captain Phillips; House of Cards
- Partner: Johanna Argan (~2005–2013)
- Children: 1

Dana Brunetti (born June 11, 1973) is an American media executive, film producer and entrepreneur.

Brunetti has been nominated for two Academy Awards for producing The Social Network and Captain Phillips and five Emmy Awards for producing the Netflix series House of Cards.

== Early life ==
Brunetti grew up in Covington, Virginia, and attended secondary school at Alleghany High School. As a child, Brunetti delivered morning and evening editions of his local newspaper.

He joined the U.S. Coast Guard in 1992 and served until 1995. During his enlistment, Brunetti moved to New York. He met actor Kevin Spacey through a chance introduction from a mutual friend while Brunetti was working at a start up digital wireless network company.

== Career ==
=== Early career ===
Shortly after meeting each other in 1997, Spacey hired Brunetti as his executive assistant. Brunetti worked with Spacey through several feature films, such as American Beauty (1999) and The Shipping News (2001).

In 2001, Brunetti transformed Spacey's Trigger Street Productions website, TriggerStreet.com, originally a static homepage for Trigger Street Productions, into a platform for aspiring filmmakers. The site was a place for users to submit screenplays and short films for feedback from other members. TriggerStreet.com was relaunched in 2002 as an early social media site, hosting member profiles, providing member ratings of submitted work and interactive forums. TriggerStreet steadily gained users resulting in it being named one of the top 50 best websites of 2004 by Time magazine. The site became known as TriggerStreet Labs and expanded to include short story submissions, it closed down in 2015.

Soon after the launch of the new TriggerStreet.com, Brunetti started working as a motion picture producer.

=== Producer ===
In 2002, Brunetti co-produced the documentaries Uncle Frank and America Rebuilds: A Year At Ground Zero through TriggerStreet. The controversial unreleased documentary Hackers Wanted was also part of the early film slate of the company.

In 2004, Spacey promoted Brunetti to President of TriggerStreet productions.

Brunetti's first feature film producing credit was as co-producer for Beyond the Sea (2004). His first full feature credit was Mini's First Time. He later produced the film The Sasquatch Dumpling Gang (2006). He also produced the Emmy-nominated Bernard and Doris.

Brunetti, a Star Wars fan himself, eagerly produced the Star Wars comedy Fanboys. The film was distributed by The Weinstein Company, and originally slated for release on August 17, 2007. However, after delays for re-shoots and disagreements over the film's final cut, the release for Fanboys was delayed until February 9, 2009. Brunetti discussed the film's struggles with the Weinstein Company in interviews on KCRW's The Business podcast and in The New York Times.

Brunetti's first major success was for 21 (2008), a film based on Ben Mezrich's New York Times best selling book Bringing Down The House. Produced on a budget of $35 million, the film went on to a worldwide gross of nearly $158 million.

Brunetti later produced Shrink and Casino Jack.

In early 2009, Brunetti teamed with Mezrich on an adaption of the book The Accidental Billionaires, which was turned into the critically acclaimed film, The Social Network. The screenplay adaptation was written by Aaron Sorkin, directed by David Fincher and told the story of Mark Zuckerberg and the founding of Facebook.com.

In writing the book on the founding of Facebook, Mezrich was in touch with some of the founding members but not all. He was having trouble contacting Eduardo Saverin. To facilitate that meeting, Brunetti had a screening in Boston of the movie based Mezrich's first book and invited Saverin to that screening. At the party following the screening, the three of them spent time discussing Mezrich's work. A later screening of the film in Las Vegas resulted in Saverin and his friends meeting with Brunetti and Mezrich again. Brunetti made sure to have Kevin Spacey attend the premiere and after party as well to ensure that their Facebook-related project would have all the momentum it needed.

The 14-page proposal by Mezrich resulted in a movie being sold to Sony that became The Social Network.

In 2011, The Social Network was nominated for eight Oscars, including Best Picture, Music (Original Score), Actor in a Leading Role, Cinematography, Directing, Film Editing, Sound Mixing and Writing (Adapted Screenplay). Brunetti talked about The Social Network on KCRW's The Business podcast.

In 2016, Brunetti admitted to finding "dates" for Saverin in his attempts to gain the latter's cooperation on the movie.

Brunetti produced Captain Phillips, which starred Tom Hanks and was directed by Paul Greengrass, which earned him his second career Academy Award nomination. In 2015, Brunetti and Michael De Luca reunited to produce the Fifty Shades of Grey film adaptation for Focus Features. In 2016, Brunetti publicly criticized the Producers Guild of America for initially not awarding him a producers mark (p.g.a. mark) for the sequel to Fifty Shades of Grey, Fifty Shades Darker. Brunetti eventually received the mark after he won a decision on appeal. He dubbed it a victory. He was also credited on the third film, Fifty Shades Freed.

=== Relativity Media ===
In January 2016 it was announced that Relativity Media, which was just emerging from Chapter 11 bankruptcy, had acquired Trigger Street Productions and that Kevin Spacey would become chairman of Relativity Studios whilst Brunetti would become the studio's president. Brunetti said in a statement. "Being a disruptor at heart, I look forward to the opportunities that being inside a studio system will present."

When the paperwork for the studio was filed for the court it emerged that Spacey had opted out of assuming the chairmanship of the studios, and by the end of 2016 Brunetti had also left Relativity whilst both remained Executive Producers on House of Cards and Manhunt: Unabomber.

=== Cavalry Media ===
In 2018 Brunetti and former Relativity Media Executive Keegan Rosenberger, co-founded Los Angeles–based media company Cavalry Media. Cavalry's core focus is the acquisition, development and production of premium feature films and scripted television series for global audiences. In 2023 Brunetti resigned from his position at Cavalry to return to solo producing.

== Filmography ==
- Uncle Frank (2002)
- Beyond the Sea (2004)
- The Sasquatch Gang (2006)
- Mini's First Time (2006)
- 21 (2008)
- Columbus Day (2008)
- Hackers Wanted (2009)
- Shrink (2009)
- Fanboys (2009)
- The Social Network (2010)
- Casino Jack (2010)
- Father of Invention (2010)
- Shakespeare High (2011)
- Inseparable (2011)
- Safe (2012)
- Captain Phillps (2013)
- Masterminds (2016)
- Fifty Shades of Grey (2015)
- Fifty Shades Darker (2017)
- Fifty Shades Freed (2018)
- Gran Turismo (2023)
- All Night Long (TBA)

=== Television ===
Brunetti and Kevin Spacey's Trigger Street Productions released their series, House of Cards, on Netflix in early 2013. The entire 13-episode first season was released on Netflix simultaneously. Spacey starred alongside Robin Wright, Kate Mara, Corey Stoll and Michael Kelly. Reed Hastings, Netflix CEO, commented on the overwhelmingly positive reaction to the release of House of Cards by saying, "[it's] a very nice confirmation of the premise that over the next couple of years we can build something very important." For his work as a producer on the show, Brunetti has earned five Emmy nominations and three PGA award nominations for Outstanding Drama Series. Brunetti remained an executive producer on the show even after Spacey was fired from the production during season 6.

In 2017 Brunetti served as an executive producer on the Discovery Channel Original series, Manhunt, Unabomber, starring Sam Worthington and Paul Bettany. The critically acclaimed series depicts a fictionalized account of the FBI's hunt for Unabomber, Ted Kaczynski.

Brunetti's additional TV producing credits include HBO's Bernard & Doris, starring Ralph Fiennes and Susan Sarandon, which received 10 Emmy nominations and CNN's factual series, Race For The White House.

== Digital media ==
In July 2011, at an event at the Talenthouse in Palo Alto, California, Brunetti offered the audience his perspective on working on House of Cards and told the audience, "Silicon Valley should start making content ... Netflix creating original content is a game changer." Brunetti also told the audience that he thought Amazon, Hulu and Fandor would join Netflix in producing their own content, which would lead to subscription cable companies (like HBO) to offer a la carte content in the next 5 years. In May 2012, Amazon announced plans to create original content. Hulu also announced similar plans in 2012. In August 2012, HBO began a la carte subscriptions for their service in Norway. In early 2013, Verizon unveiled plans to offer cable channels a la carte to consumers.

He told an audience in September 2012 that web video will "destroy networks and conglomerates as we know it."

In 2014, Brunetti sat down with former Facebook executive Randi Zuckerberg for an interview at SXSW Film Festival about the future of media, personal branding online, and how Hollywood and Silicon Valley continue to converge. On the subject of crowdfunding, Brunetti suggested it was "a genius idea that's gotten a little out of hand ... I think it's wrong when people like Zach Braff or Spike Lee utilize that same service to fund their films when they already have access", he added. "I think it overshadows the little guys who actually need the funding."

On October 22, 2020, Brunetti was named as an associate executive producer of the No Agenda podcast, episode 1288. The show is hosted every Sunday and Thursday by Adam Curry and John C. Dvorak. He went on to executive produce "Hairy Legs" episode 1290.

=== Brand partnerships ===
As an innovator in social networking, Brunetti launched online social networking and file-sharing platform, triggerstreet.com for feedback and exposure of undiscovered writing and filmmaking talent in 2002. Anheuser-Busch forged an eight-year sponsorship with the site, which was the brewing company's longest ever sponsorship deal outside of sports. In 2012, Brunetti, Trigger Street and Jameson Irish Whiskey launched Jameson First Shot, a short-film competition for up-and-coming filmmakers. Jameson First Shot stars have included, Uma Thurman, Maggie Gyllenhaal, Willem Dafoe, Kevin Spacey, Adrien Brody and Dominic West.

== Personal life ==
Brunetti's mother left his father, Ron Brunetti, a U.S. Postal Service mail carrier, when Brunetti was a baby. He has a stepmother, Joanne, a sister, Carla, a credit union employee in Pennsylvania; and three brothers: Brian, a helicopter pilot for Presidential Airways based in Afghanistan; Erik, a Los Angeles–based artist and designer who created the FUCT line of street wear clothing; and Alex, who works for an ophthalmologist in Kentucky.

When Brunetti turned 18 he spent two weeks in hospital and almost lost an eye water skiing when the ski rope snapped. Around the same time he discovered in a family counseling session that his biological mother had left his father for another woman.

Brunetti is the nephew of John C. Dvorak.

He went onto have a long-term relationship with costume designer Johanna Argan from prior to 2005 which ended amicably in 2013. The couple have a daughter, born on October 10, 2012. In 2014, he dated actress Kristin Chenoweth.

Brunetti is currently engaged to former model and intellectual property lawyer, Alexandra Pakzad, daughter of the late fashion designer Bijan Pakzad.
