= Lanier Theological Library =

Research library in Texas

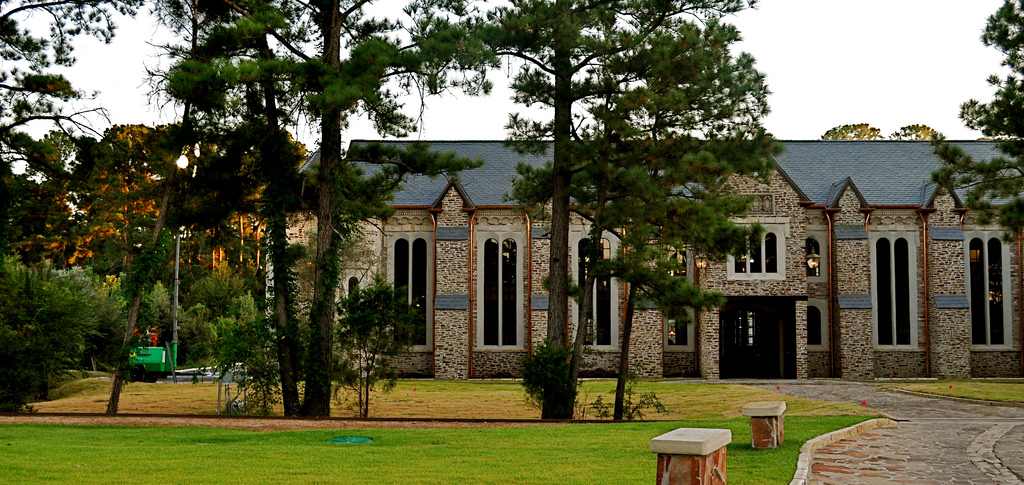
- Exterior of the Library.
- 29.977710633255356°N 95.54839991795082°W
- Location: Houston, Texas, United States
- Established: 2010

Other information
- Website: lanierlibraryandlearningcenter.org

Lanier Theological Library (LTL) is a private, theological research library. It is a 17,000 sq. ft non-circulating research library located in northwest Houston, Texas.

It was opened in 2010 and was built by lawyer Mark Lanier, who has taught Sunday school at Champion Forest Baptist Church for more than 20 years, and is part of his 35-acre estate. He designed the library by combining his favorite architectural features from the libraries in and around the University of Oxford.

The LTL displays Christian artifacts such as handwritten letters by author C. S. Lewis, artwork from his Chronicles of Narnia book series, two copies of the original 1611 King James Version Bible and a fragment of the Dead Sea Scrolls. It includes more than 120,000 volumes and periodicals with daily additions.

== Design ==
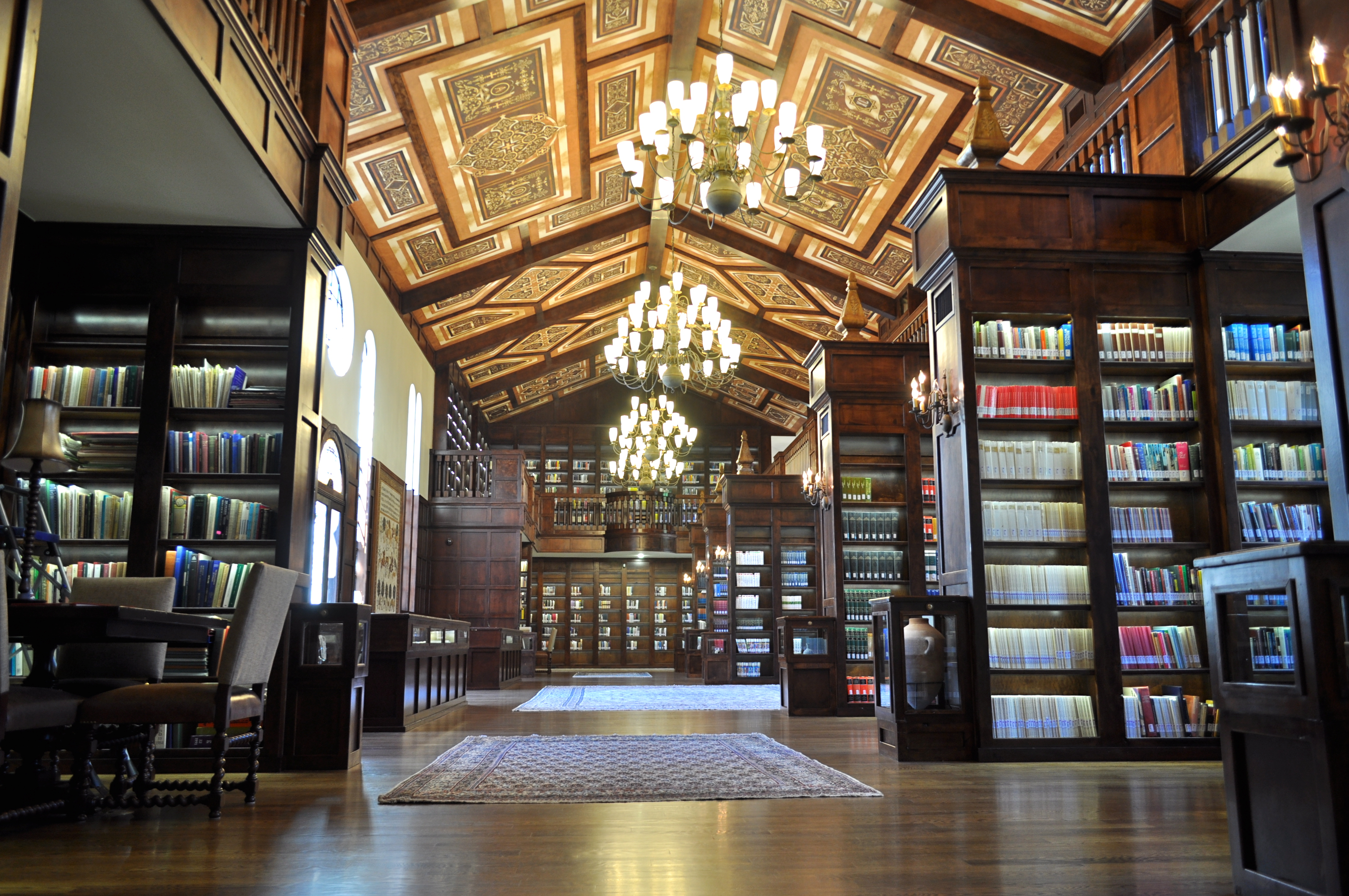
Main hall of the Lanier Theological Library.

Lanier Theological Library is 17,000 square feet on 10 acres including a stone chapel reconstruction of a 500 A.D. Byzantine chapel adjacent to the LTL and an English village with a train, cobblestone street and dining hall. The chapel's ceilings feature scenes from the Bible painted by Texas artist Richard McCluskey. He also painted the ceiling of the library's main hall. It opened to the public in October 2010 and is maintained and facilitated by the Lanier Theological Library Foundation. The LTL is free for public use during regular operating hours and uses the Library of Congress Classification system.

== Artifacts and private collections ==
The LTL specializes in Archaeology, Biblical studies, church history, the Dead Sea Scrolls, Egyptology, Linguistics, and Theology.

The LTL has acquired numerous private collections from many accomplished scholars, including David Bivin, Chaim Cohen, Alan Crown, Trude Dothan, Peter Flint, Florentino Garcia-Martinez, Moshe Goshen-Gottstein, William W. Hallo, Larry Hurtado, Robert Lindsey, Abraham Malamat, Carol and Eric Meyers, David Owen, Randall Price, Alan Segal, and Emanuel Tov. These collections are displayed in the library’s main hall and remain available for patrons’ use.

=== Dead Sea Scrolls and Qumran Scrolls Jar ===
An original fragment from the Dead Sea Scrolls is on display at the LTL. This fragment contains some of the Hebrew words found in Amos 7:7-8:1.

In 2017 the LTL acquired an original Qumran Scrolls Jar, one of four worldwide in private hands (others are in Norway, England, and Bethlehem). This jar is approximately 2,000 years old, having been produced between 50 BCE and 50 CE. It was excavated in April 1966 by Dr. Solomon H. Steckoll within one of the buildings on the main plateau of the Qumran site at the edge of the Dead Sea. The jar is 23.7 in (60.1 cm) high, 11.8 in (29.9 cm) in diameter, and 36.6 in (92.9 cm) in circumference. The opening at the top of the jar is 5 in. (12.7 cm) wide.

=== First edition, first issue 1611 KJV Bibles ===
A “First Edition, First Issue” King James Version Bible, printed in 1611, commonly known as “The Great He Bible” and a “Second Folio Edition” of the KJV Bible, commonly known as “The Great She Bible” are owned by and displayed at the LTL. Less than 200 of “The Great He Bibles” exist today. The Old Testament of “The Great She Bible” was printed in 1613, but the New Testament was printed in 1611.

=== Facsimiles ===
In 2015, A. E. Tracy Potts gave the LTL two tablets resembling what Moses brought down from Mt. Sinai, as described in Exodus and Deuteronomy. The Ten Commandments are carefully inscribed on the front and back of each tablet with paleo-Hebrew letters which have been sandblasted into the stone. Each tablet weighs 50 pounds.

Other facsimiles on display include a Great Isaiah Scroll from the Dead Sea Scrolls, the Commentary on Habakkuk, and the Rule of the Community.

=== Ancient artifacts ===
The LTL possesses a vast collection of ancient artifacts ranging from the Early Bronze Age to the late Iron Age. Pottery, lamps, vases, chalices, serving jugs, and numerous figurines from the ancient world line the halls of the LTL. Archeologists and scholars use these artifacts, with dates ranging from 2000 BCE to 5 CE, to glean valuable information about ancient cultures.

=== C. S. Lewis collection ===
Patrons of the LTL can enjoy the second largest collection of C. S. Lewis artifacts in the US. It includes 60 first edition books, starting with Lewis’s first book, Spirits in Bondage: A Cycle of Lyrics. The collection features a 9-page autograph manuscript of Lewis’s famous address in 1939 after the outbreak of World War II, now known as “Learning in War-Time”. There are four original illustrations from Prince Caspian by Pauline Baynes, illustrator for The Chronicles of Narnia stories, as well as several original handwritten notes and letters from C. S. Lewis. Lewis was in a group of scholars known as “The Inklings”, including J. R. R. Tolkien, Charles Williams, and Owen Barfield.

== Lectures ==
The LTL hosts lectures by world-renowned theologians and scholars of diverse nationalities and theological backgrounds. Library speakers have included:

- Robert Willis, Dean of Canterbury, Canterbury Cathedral, UK
- Father Justin, Saint Catherine's Monastery at the base of Mount Sinai, Egypt
- Richard Bauckham, University of Cambridge
- John Behr, University of Aberdeen
- Michael Card, Christian singer-songwriter and author
- D. A. Carson, Trinity Evangelical Divinity School
- Lynn H. Cohick, Northern Seminary
- Weston Fields, Dead Sea Scrolls Foundation
- Edward Fudge, American Christian theologian and lawyer
- Yosef Garfinkel, University of Jerusalem
- Simon Gathercole, University of Cambridge
- Kathryne Hayhoe, Texas Tech University
- Richard B. Hays, Duke Divinity School
- James Hoffmeir, Trinity Evangelical Divinity School
- Larry Hurtado, University of Edinburgh
- Andrew Macintosh, University of Cambridge
- Alister McGrath, University of Oxford
- Scot McNight, Northern Seminary
- John Piper, Bethlehem College and Seminary
- Antonin Scalia, U.S. Supreme Court
- Peter Williams, Tyndale House, Cambridge
- N.T. Wright, Theologian, Wycliffe Hall, University of Oxford
