= The Good Student =

- DVD cover
- Directed by: David Ostry
- Written by: Adam Targum
- Produced by: Kevin Spacey; Dana Brunetti; Adam Kassen; Mark Kassen
- Starring: Tim Daly; Hayden Panettiere; William Sadler; Dan Hedaya; Paula Devicq; John Gallagher Jr. Sarah Steele; Brian Anthony Wilson
- Cinematography: Jordan Lynn
- Edited by: Julie Carr; Robert Swartz
- Music by: Randy Lee
- Production company: Trigger Street Productions
- Distributed by: Screen Media Ventures
- Release date: January 1, 2006
- Running time: 90 minutes
- Country: United States
- Language: English

The Good Student, also known as Mr. Gibb, is a 2006 American dark comedy drama film starring Tim Daly and Hayden Panettiere.

== Plot ==
Mr. Ronald Gibb is a high school history teacher, whose life has fallen apart - he is reportedly widowed, living in a messy trailer-home, and largely uncaring about life. Although he is depicted as a creative if weak-willed teacher, his students lack interest for the subject matter. One of his students, Ally Palmer, is a popular cheerleader, and a local celebrity, after being featured in a television commercial for her father's car dealership.

Mr. Gibb has a not-so-secret crush on Ally (other students, and the school janitor, have noted it). He often stares at her inappropriately. One day after school, he overhears Ally and her boyfriend Brett get into a big argument, and they break up. She no longer has a ride home from school, so he offers to take her home. Mr. Gibb and Ally are photographed (by one photography-wise student who was aware of his crush) just as she spontaneously kisses him on the lips (to thank him for giving her an unexpected A), and as such the school board deems his behavior unacceptable and unprofessional; he is suspended from his teaching position. Ally goes missing after Mr. Gibb dropped her off at her house. The news reports that a kidnapping has occurred. Mr. Gibb is the primary suspect because police officials find evidence that he was with Ally moments before she was kidnapped. Considerable public attention is focused on the kidnapping, and the girl's unscrupulous father takes advantage by tying a large sales drive to the missing girl. The film follows Gibb as he copes with public humiliation and ends with a sudden twist in the final minutes. The apparently innocent teacher is seen in a new light, but many questions remain unanswered.

== Cast ==
- Tim Daly as Ronald Gibb, the high-school teacher
- Hayden Panettiere as Ally Palmer, the kidnapped student
- William Sadler as Phil Palmer, the girl's father
- Dan Hedaya as Gabe, the school janitor
- Paula Devicq as Holly, a neighbor who sees Mr. Gibb as a romantic possibility
- John Gallagher Jr. as Brett Mullen, Allyson's boyfriend
- Sarah Steele as Amber, the photography-wise student
- Brian Anthony Wilson as Detective Dick Moon
- Andrew Benator as Kari
- Rita Gardner as Marge Whitman
- Mark Kassen as Pete Macauley
- Sadler Colley Bakst as Caroline
- Lisa Lynds as Tiff
- Maureen Mueller as Evelyn Hirsch

== Production ==
The story is based in Poughkeepsie, New York, and some of the footage was filmed there, including Poughkeepsie Middle School and Vassar College. The film was released in 2006 with an R rating for theatrical distribution, at 1:30 length. It was released for TV use in 2008 with an apparently gratuitous nude scene removed and a 1:19 runtime.

== Reception ==
The movie received mixed reviews. As of 2022, it holds a 4.8/10 rating on movie aggregator IMDb, and a 40% rating on Rotten Tomatoes.
