= Chris Evans (actor) =

American actor (born 1981)

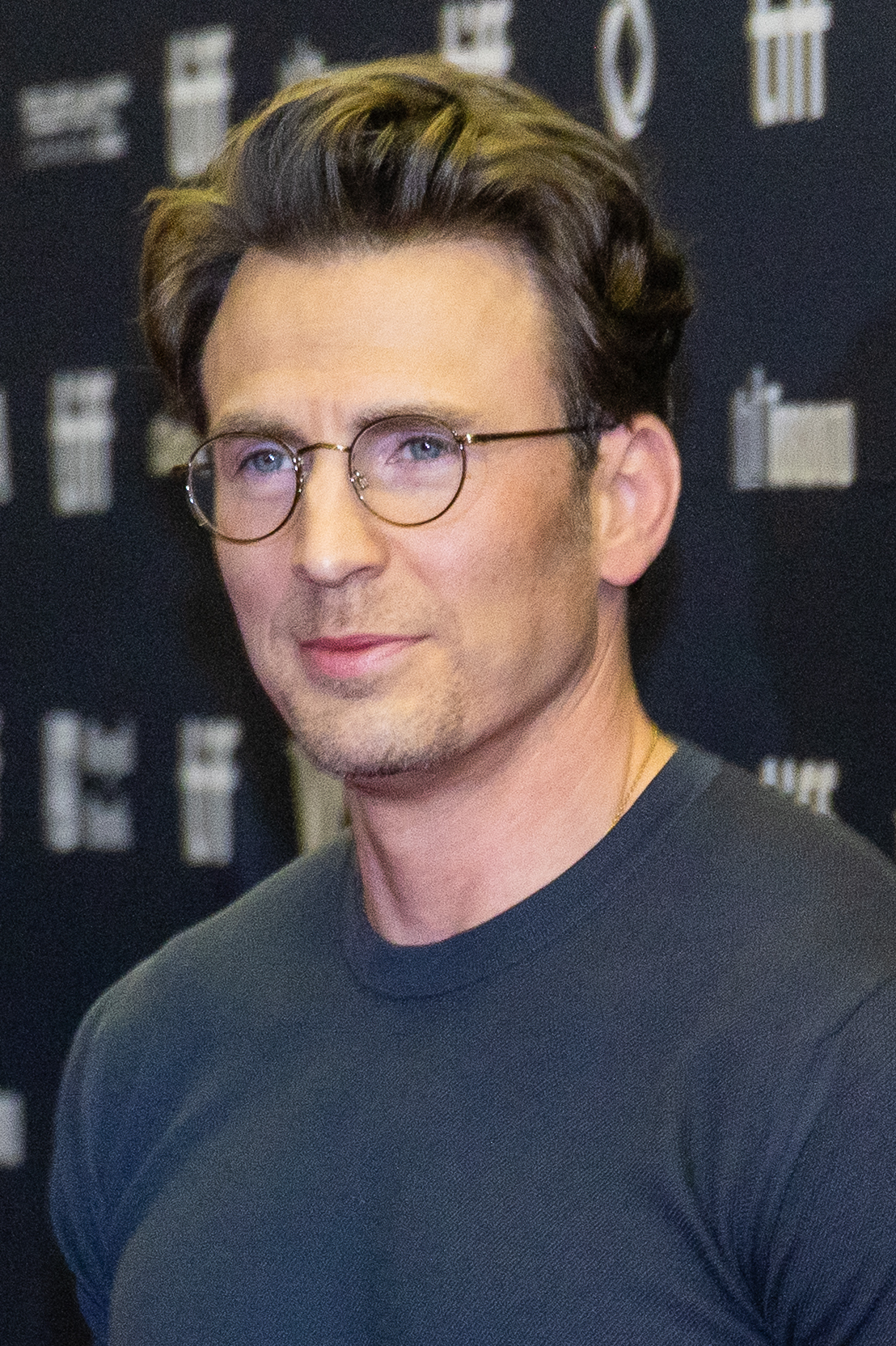
- Evans in 2025
- Born: Christopher Robert Evans; June 13, 1981 (age 45); Boston, Massachusetts, U.S.
- Years active: 1997–present
- Works: Full list
- Spouse: Alba Baptista (m. 2023)
- Children: 1
- Relatives: Scott Evans (brother); Mike Capuano (maternal uncle)

Christopher Robert Evans (born June 13, 1981) is an American actor. His films as a leading performer have grossed $11.4 billion worldwide, making him one of the highest-grossing film stars of all time and one of the world's highest-paid actors. His accolades include nominations for two Critics' Choice Awards and a Drama League Award.

After a number of early roles, Evans gained recognition for portraying Johnny Storm / Human Torch in the superhero films Fantastic Four (2005) and Fantastic Four: Rise of the Silver Surfer (2007). He achieved global stardom for portraying Steve Rogers / Captain America in the Marvel Cinematic Universe (MCU), beginning with Captain America: The First Avenger (2011) and appearing in eleven films for the franchise; he was twice nominated for the Critics' Choice Award for Best Actor in an Action Movie. He made further appearances in adaptations of comic books and graphic novels: TMNT (2007), Scott Pilgrim vs. the World (2010), Snowpiercer (2013), Scott Pilgrim Takes Off (2023), and Deadpool & Wolverine (2024).

Aside from comic book roles, Evans has starred in the drama Gifted (2017), the mystery film Knives Out (2019), the television miniseries Defending Jacob (2020), and the action films The Gray Man (2022) and Red One (2024). He made his directorial debut in 2014 with the romantic drama Before We Go, which he also produced and starred in. His Broadway debut in the 2018 revival of Kenneth Lonergan's play Lobby Hero earned him a Drama League Award nomination.

== Early life ==
Christopher Robert Evans was born on June 13, 1981, in Boston, Massachusetts, and grew up in the nearby town of Sudbury. His mother, Lisa (née Capuano), is an artistic director at the Concord Youth Theater, and his father, Bob, is a dentist. His father is of Irish descent, while his mother is of half Irish and half Italian descent. His parents divorced in 1999.

Evans has two sisters, Carly and Shanna, and a brother, Scott. He and his siblings were raised Catholic. Their uncle, Mike Capuano, served as mayor of Somerville, Massachusetts, from 1990 to 1999, and as a US Representative from 1999 to 2019.

He enjoyed musical theater as a child, and attended acting camp. He played Randolph MacAfee in the musical Bye Bye Birdie. He and his siblings also performed in front of relatives during Christmases, recalling that being onstage "felt like home." Before starting his senior year of high school, Evans spent the summer in New York City, and took classes at the Lee Strasberg Theatre and Film Institute. Evans graduated from Lincoln-Sudbury Regional High School in 1999. He was a schoolmate of Jeremy Strong. His first acting gig outside of community theater was for Eric Ogden's short film Paper Boy, which he received via Backstage.

== Career ==
=== 1997–2004: Early roles ===
Evans's first credited appearance was in a short educational film titled Biodiversity: Wild About Life! in 1997. In 1999, Evans was the model for "Tyler" in Hasbro's board game Mystery Date. The special edition of the game included an electronic phone, which Evans is shown speaking into on the game box.

In the same year, Evans made his screen debut in a television film, The Newcomers; a family drama in which he plays a boy called Judd who falls in love with a girl (Kate Bosworth). Evans also had a lead role in the television series Opposite Sex which lasted for eight episodes. Lastly, Evans acted in an episode of The Fugitive titled "Guilt".

In 2001, he starred in Not Another Teen Movie, a parody of teen movies, in which he plays a high school footballer. The film garnered mainly negative reviews, but grossed $38 million domestically and $28 million overseas for a worldwide $66 million.

In 2004, he had a lead role in The Perfect Score, a teen heist-comedy about a group of students who break into an office to steal answers to the SAT exam. The film was critically panned; Matthew Leyland of the BBC thought Evans' performance was "bland", and the cast had "little chemistry". Also that year, he co-starred in the action-thriller Cellular, with Jason Statham, Kim Basinger and William H. Macy. Evans plays college student Ryan, who must save a kidnapped woman (Basinger), after randomly receiving a phone call from her. Although the feature received a mixed response, Slant Magazine's review opined that "Evans proves himself a sufficiently charismatic leading man". In a retrospective interview, Evans remarked that some of his early films were "really terrible".

=== 2005–2010: Breakthrough ===
In 2005, Evans starred in the independent drama Fierce People, an adaptation of Dirk Wittenborn's 2002 novel of the same name. He also starred in London (2005), a romantic drama, in which he played a drug user with relationship problems. London was negatively received by critics; Variety magazine described it as "noxious", and thought Evans' character was the worst, and film critic Roger Ebert called the film "dreck".

For his first comic book role, he portrayed superhero Johnny Storm / Human Torch in Fantastic Four (2005), based on the Marvel Comic of the same name. Upon release, the film was a commercial success despite a divided reception. In his mixed review, Joe Leydon of Variety praised the cast for their efforts and thought Evans gave a "charismatic breakout performance". Two years later, he reprised the role of Johnny Storm / Human Torch in the sequel Fantastic Four: Rise of the Silver Surfer (2007). Toronto Star's Rob Salem thought the film was a "significant improvement" from the first, and the critic from Chicago Reader thought the cast were "amusing enough" to carry the sequel. In 2016, reflecting on his experience of the Fantastic Four films, Evans said they left him "a little uneasy – because the movies weren't exactly the way I'd envisioned them".

He voiced the character Casey Jones in the animation TMNT (2007), based on the Teenage Mutant Ninja Turtles comic book series. The film was released by Warner Bros. Pictures and The Weinstein Company, to mixed reviews from critics but was a commercial success, grossing $95 million worldwide. Next, he starred in Danny Boyle's science fiction thriller Sunshine (2007), about a group of astronauts on a dangerous mission to reignite the dying sun. It garnered generally favorable reviews; Roger Ebert wrote the cast were "effective ... they almost all play professional astronaut/scientists, and not action-movie heroes". He also had a role in the comedy drama The Nanny Diaries (2007), in which he plays the love interest to Scarlett Johansson's character. His final release of 2007 was in the science fiction animation Battle for Terra. It premiered at the 2007 Toronto International Film Festival, followed by a wider theatrical release in 2009. Critical reception was largely mixed.

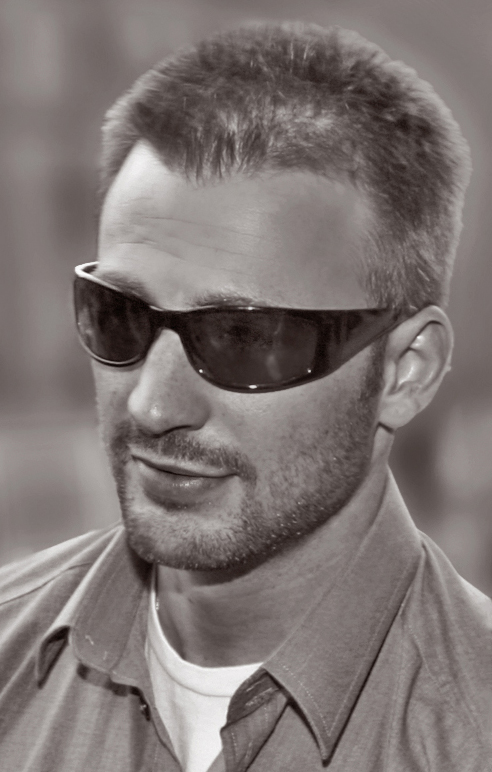
Evans in 2008

In 2008, Evans appeared as Detective Paul Diskant in the thriller Street Kings, with co-stars Keanu Reeves, Forest Whitaker, and Hugh Laurie. He was cast in The Loss of a Teardrop Diamond, co-starring Bryce Dallas Howard and Ellen Burstyn. It is a romantic drama based on Tennessee Williams' 1957 screenplay. The feature received negative reviews, and The Village Voice critic called Evans' performance "catatonic". The following year, he played a character with telekinetic abilities in the science fiction thriller Push, with Dakota Fanning and Camilla Belle. The film's response was generally negative, while Mick LaSelle of San Francisco Chronicle criticized the story which "makes no sense", and predicted that Evans, "one of these days he's going to make a good movie".

In 2010, Evans appeared in Sylvain White's The Losers, an adaptation of the comic book series of the same name from the DC Comics imprint Vertigo. Evans was drawn to playing Captain Jake Jensen because the character "doesn't take things too seriously. He's the one that kind of loves life and he's always looking for a joke". Although the film gained mixed reviews, The Guardian's critic praised the cast for their "breezy charm" and for Evans' comic relief. Evans appeared in another comic book adaptation, Edgar Wright's Scott Pilgrim vs. the World (2010), in which he portrayed Lucas Lee, one of Ramona Flowers' seven evil exes. The film was a box-office bomb but received positive reviews from critics and found a second life as a cult film. He starred in Mark Kassen and Adam Kassen's drama, Puncture, which was filmed in Houston, Texas. The film premiered at the 2011 Tribeca Film Festival as one of the spotlight projects for the 10th anniversary of the festival. Evans portrays Mike Weiss, who was a real-life young lawyer and drug addict. Upon release, critical reception was divided. Consecutively, Evans was cast in the romantic comedy What's Your Number? (2011) opposite Anna Faris, an adaptation of Karyn Bosnak's book 20 Times a Lady. Nathan Rabin of The A.V. Club gave the film a grade C+, and opined that Evans' and Faris' chemistry was "frisky".

=== 2011–2017: Captain America and directorial debut ===
In 2010, Evans signed on for a multi-film deal with Marvel Studios, to portray Marvel Comics character Steve Rogers / Captain America. Evans initially turned down the part due to stress of fame, but he consulted with Robert Downey Jr., who encouraged him to take the role. At Marvel's persistence, Evans accepted, and he went to see a therapist afterwards to relieve his anxiety.He found the character fun to portray, and added, "I think Marvel is doing a lot of good things right now". The first film to be released was Captain America: The First Avenger (2011). The film was a critical and commercial success, earning over $370 million worldwide box office. In their positive review, The Sydney Morning Herald thought the film was a "fresh twist on 20th-century history", and praised Evans' "confident-but-subtle treatment" displayed in his role.

A year later, he reprised the character in The Avengers, with a large ensemble cast that included Robert Downey Jr., Mark Ruffalo, Chris Hemsworth, Scarlett Johansson and Jeremy Renner. The feature was another commercial success; it grossed $1.519 billion and became one of the highest-grossing films of all time. For his last release of 2012, he played hitman Robert Pronge in the biographical film The Iceman, about the murderer Richard Kuklinski. Evans' role was originally intended for James Franco, but he dropped out before filming began. Writing for The Hollywood Reporter, David Rooney complimented Evans' versatile performance, which was unlike his Captain America persona.

Returning to the science fiction genre, Evans was cast in Bong Joon-ho's Snowpiercer (2013), which is based on the French graphic novel Le Transperceneige. Bong was initially reluctant to cast him, but changed his mind after seeing Evans' performances in Sunshine and Puncture, which showed a "sensitive" side. The film was critically acclaimed, with the critic from Salon magazine describing the cast performances as "sensational".

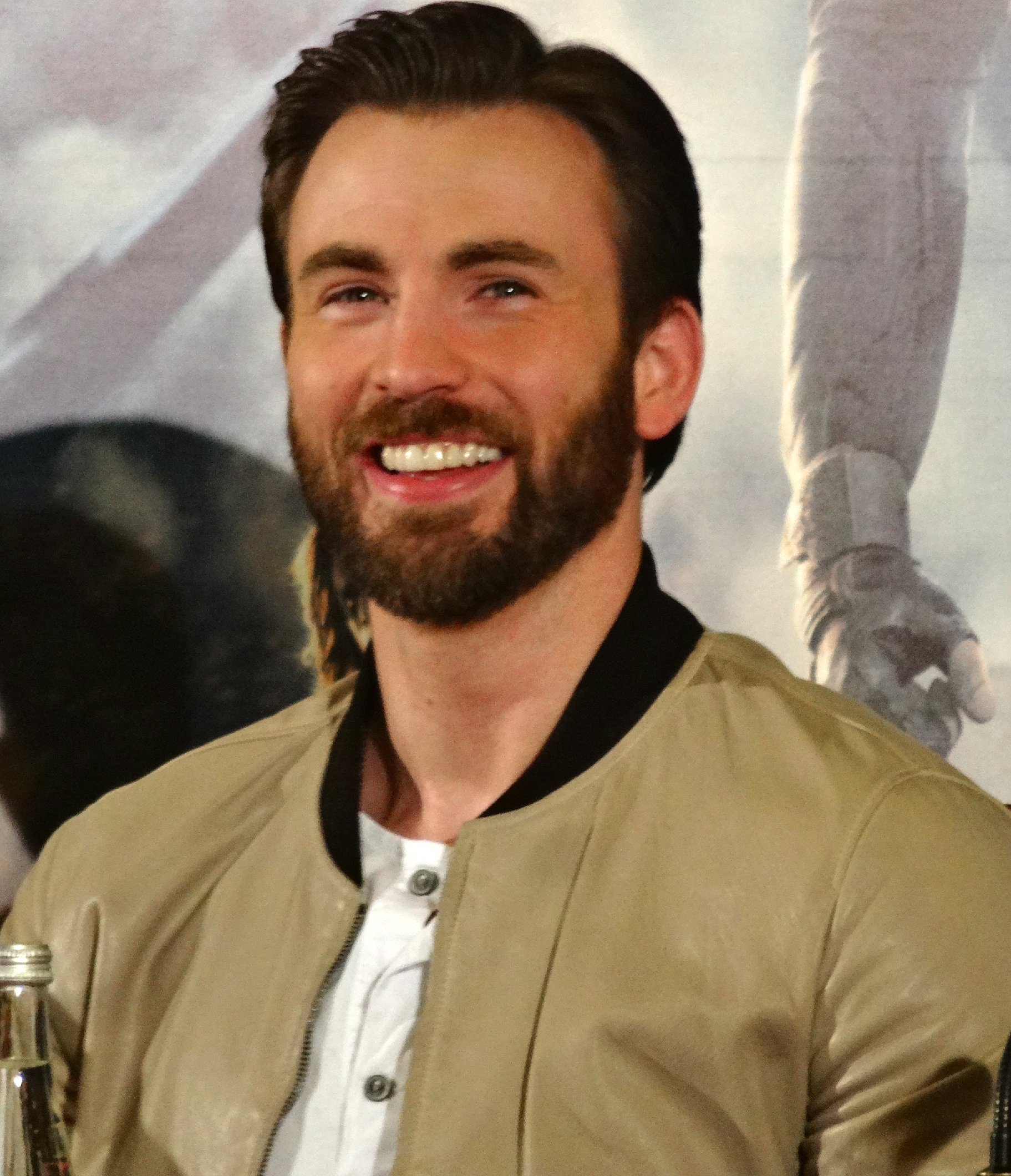
Evans at a press conference for Captain America: The Winter Soldier in 2014

In 2014, Evans starred in Captain America: The Winter Soldier, the sequel to Captain America: The First Avenger. Evans prepared by undertaking three months of strength training and learning all the fight sequences. Similarly to the first film, it was well received and a commercial success, grossing $714 million worldwide. Peter Howell of Toronto Star thought Evans was "impressive" for bringing the comic book character to life, despite the plot being "a little too complicated". Evans has said The Winter Soldier was his favorite Marvel film because he started to understand his character and enjoyed working with directors Anthony and Joe Russo.

In March 2014, Evans said he may consider doing less acting so that he can focus on directing. In the same year, he made his directorial debut in the romantic comedy Before We Go, in which he also starred, opposite Alice Eve. The film tells the story of two strangers who meet at Grand Central Terminal, and form an unlikely bond overnight. It premiered at the 2014 Toronto International Film Festival; The New York Times critic, Ben Keninsberg, opined that it was a moderate effort and the actors' chemistry made it watchable. In the same year, he starred in another romantic comedy, opposite Michelle Monaghan in Playing It Cool. The following year, he reprised his role as Captain America in Avengers: Age of Ultron (2015) and in Captain America: Civil War. Both of these films were box office hits, grossing $1.4 billion and $1.1 billion worldwide, respectively. The Hollywood Reporter later learned that his salary for Civil War was $15 million.

In 2017, Evans starred in the family drama Gifted, about an intellectually gifted seven-year-old who becomes the subject of a custody battle between her uncle (Evans) and grandmother (Lindsay Duncan). The film received a favorable response; Empire magazine opined that Evans played his part with "conviction" despite a predictable plot. In the same year, he was invited to join the Academy of Motion Picture Arts and Sciences.

=== 2018–present: Avengers films and beyond ===
In 2018, he starred in the sequel Avengers: Infinity War, and in spring 2019, the fourth sequel Avengers: Endgame. Both of these were directed by Anthony and Joe Russo. Evans admitted that he and Scarlett Johansson did not see the full script to Avengers: Infinity War before filming, saying, "We had to fight to get an actual paper script. There were giving us either pages or bits on an iPad. It's been tricky." While USA Today opined that Evans and co-star Chris Hemsworth were a "blast to watch" in Avengers: Infinity War, the reviewer from Time magazine criticized the film for its lack of pacing and substance. When Avengers: Endgame completed filming in October 2018, Evans explained that it was emotional: "For the last month of filming I was letting myself go to work every day and be a little overwhelmed and a little nostalgic and grateful. By the last day, I was bawling. I cry pretty easy, but I was definitely bawling."

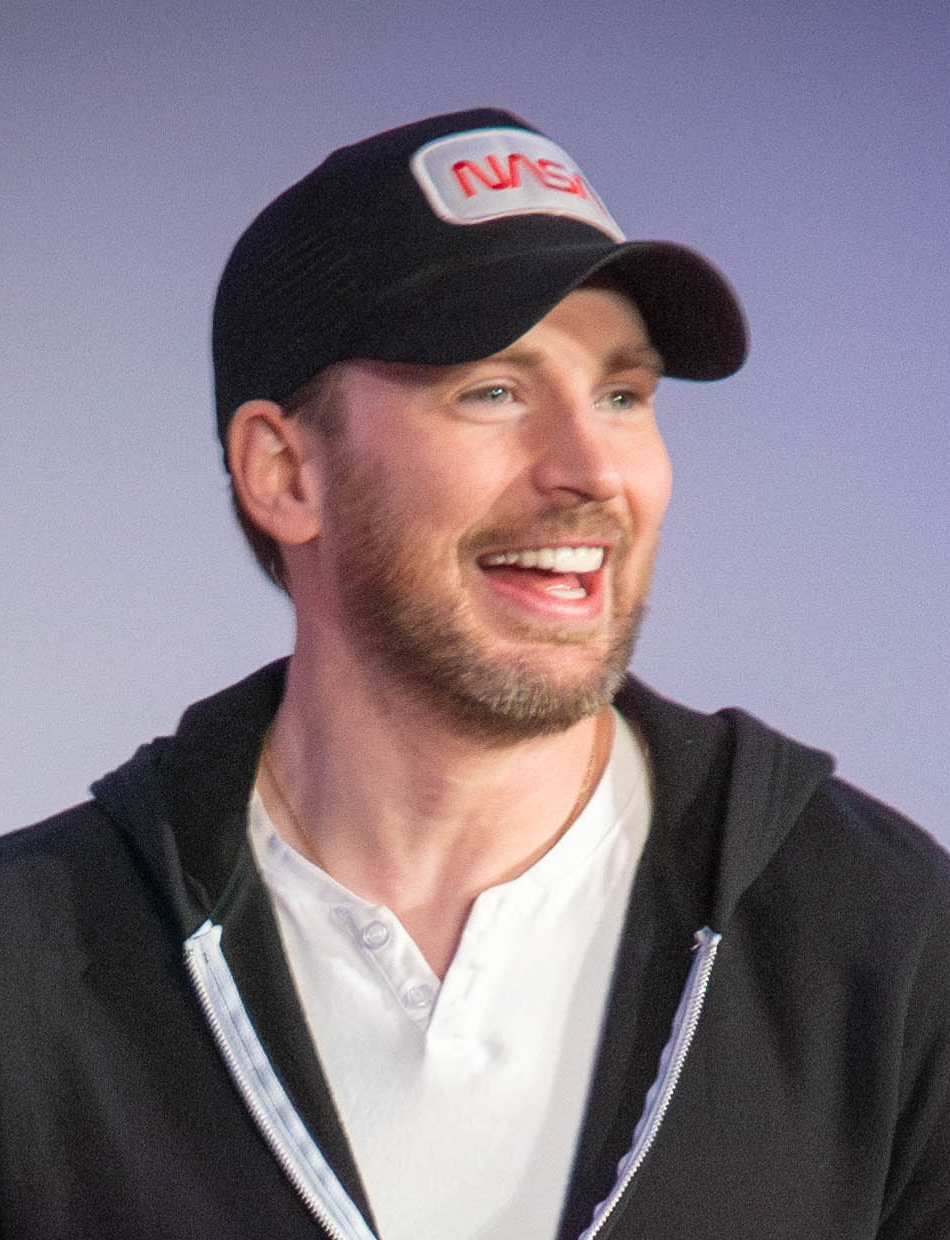
Evans in 2023

Evans made his Broadway debut in the play Lobby Hero, directed by Trip Cullman, which opened in March 2018 at the Helen Hayes Theatre as a part of Second Stage Theatre's first Broadway season. Ben Brantley of The New York Times labeled it a "terrific Broadway debut" and found his performance to be a "marvel of smooth calculation and bluster". Evans was nominated for a Drama League Award. In 2019, Evans played an Israeli Mossad agent in the Netflix thriller The Red Sea Diving Resort, loosely based on the events of Operation Moses and Operation Joshua in 1984–85. Frank Scheck of The Hollywood Reporter gave the film a mixed review; he thought Evans gave a "sincere" performance, despite observing weaknesses in the film's pacing and tone. Later that year, he starred as Ransom Drysdale, a spoiled playboy, in Rian Johnson's mystery film Knives Out, which received critical acclaim and grossed $309 million worldwide. In NPR, Linda Holmes wrote of Evans's performance: "it's a special treat to see him tear right into this rich-brat bit, both preternaturally handsome and cheerfully obnoxious, a one-man cable-knit charm offensive."

In 2020, Evans starred in Defending Jacob, an Apple TV+ crime drama miniseries based on the novel of the same name. He played Andy Barber, an assistant district attorney whose son is accused of murder. Daniel Fienberg of The Hollywood Reporter praised Evans's performance, stating that he "is sturdy and conveys the right measure of empathy and fear". He had a cameo in Adam McKay's Netflix comedy, Don't Look Up, which featured an ensemble cast. In 2022, Evans voiced the titular character in the Disney/Pixar animation Lightyear, which gained mostly favorable reviews, and starred in the Netflix thriller The Gray Man, an adaptation of the 2009 novel of the same name directed by Anthony and Joe Russo. The Gray Man received mixed reviews, but had strong viewership on Netflix.

Evans starred alongside Ana de Armas in the Apple TV+ action comedy film Ghosted (2023), from director Dexter Fletcher. Several critics panned the film, Evans performance and his lack of chemistry with de Armas. Both Evans and de Armas was nominated for Worst Actor and Worst Actress category. His next film was the Netflix crime drama Pain Hustlers, also received poor reviews from critics. He then reprised his role of Lucas Lee in the animated television series Scott Pilgrim Takes Off and Johnny Storm / Human Torch in a cameo in Deadpool & Wolverine (2024). Evans starred with Dwayne Johnson in the action comedy Red One. The film received generally negative reviews and Evan's performance was particularly criticized, describing his role as flat and forgettable.In 2025, he starred alongside Margaret Qualley and Aubrey Plaza in the black comedy film Honey Don't!. The film and his performance also received negative reception.

In December 2025, Evans was revealed to be reprising the role of Steve Rogers in Avengers: Doomsday (2026).

== Personal life ==
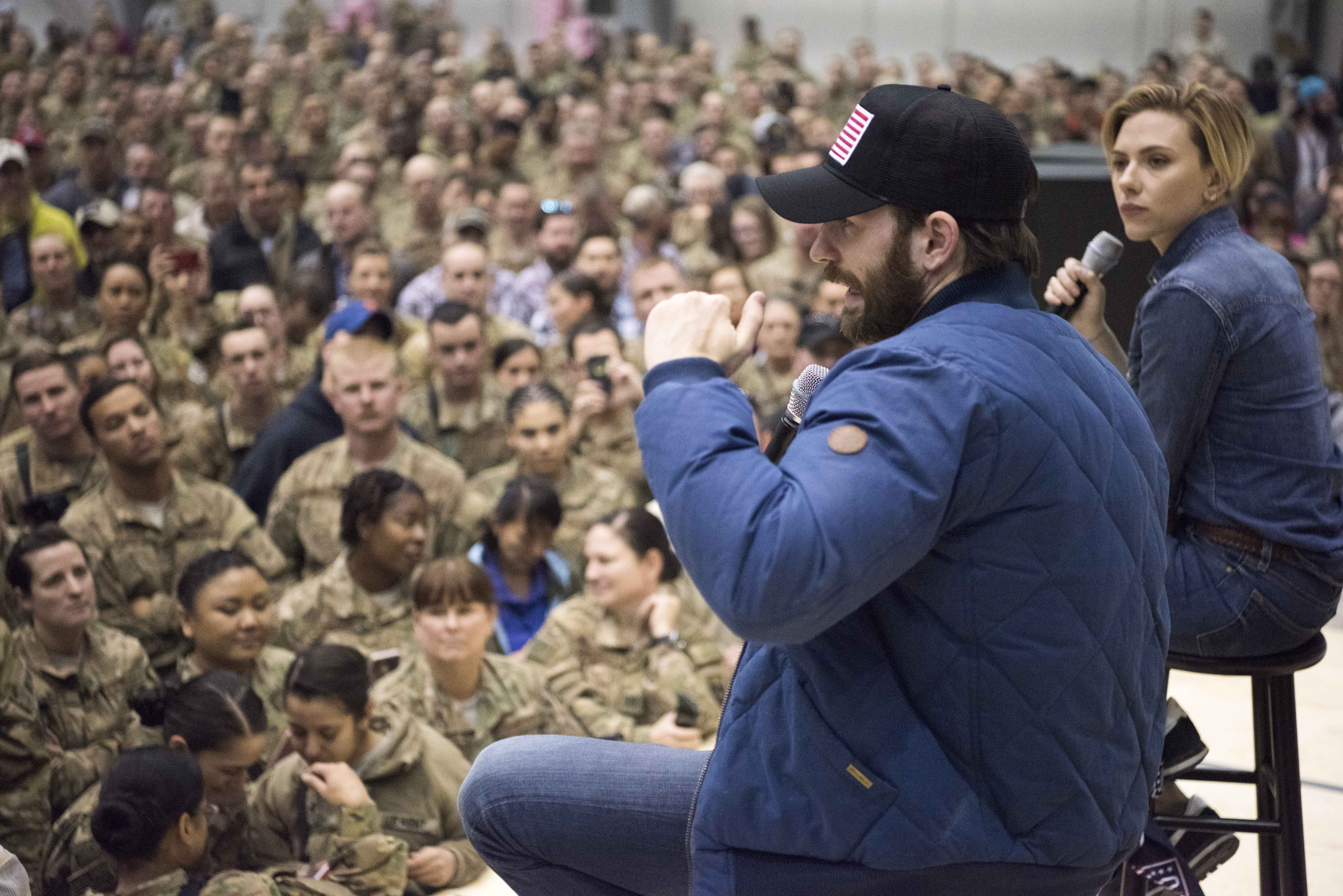
Evans and Scarlett Johansson attending the USO Holiday Tour at Bagram Air Base, Afghanistan, in 2016

Evans married Portuguese actress Alba Baptista on September 9, 2023, in a private at-home ceremony on Cape Cod in Massachusetts. The couple had their first child, a daughter, in October 2025. While filming Gifted in 2015, Evans adopted a dog named Dodger from a local animal shelter.

Evans has identified with Buddhism. However, he does not describe himself as a Buddhist, saying he follows Eastern philosophies more generally, including Taoism. He has also said that "it's just the dogma that separates these religions", and that "I'm not going to get caught up in that." He appeared on Oprah's Book Club, where he asked Eckhart Tolle a question and revealed that he has a tattoo of one of Tolle's quotes.

He is a fan of the New England Patriots, and narrated the documentary series America's Game: The Story of the 2014 New England Patriots and America's Game: 2016 Patriots.

In 2022, he was named the "Sexiest Man Alive" by People magazine. He is frequently cited as part of a group of Hollywood actors commonly known as the "Hollywood Chrises", which also includes Chrises Hemsworth, Pine, and Pratt.

=== Political views ===
Evans affirmed his support for same-sex marriage in 2012, stating, "It's insane that civil rights are being denied people in this day and age. It's embarrassing, and it's heartbreaking. It goes without saying that I'm completely in support of gay marriage. In ten years we'll be ashamed that this was an issue." This has extended to his Marvel work, speaking positively on the popular fan-pairing of Bucky and Steve. In August 2016, he supported Massachusetts Attorney General Maura Healey's continued enforcement of the state's ban on assault weapons. Evans endorsed Hillary Clinton in the 2016 presidential election, and was an outspoken critic of Donald Trump's presidency.

After Alabama enacted the Human Life Protection Act in May 2019, which imposes a near-total ban on abortions in the state, Evans called the bill "absolutely unbelievable" and continued by writing, "If you're not worried about Roe v. Wade, you're not paying attention." In July 2020, he launched A Starting Point, a website that publishes short interviews of American elected officials on political issues, with a goal of presenting "both the Democratic and Republican point of view on dozens of issues across the political landscape." In October 2020, Evans took part in a virtual fundraising event in support of Joe Biden in his 2020 presidential campaign. He endorsed Maya Wiley in the 2021 New York City Democratic mayoral primary.

=== Philanthropy ===
Evans is a supporter of Christopher's Haven, a charity providing housing to families affected by childhood cancer, and has taken part in fundraisers to benefit the organization. In 2015, he and actor Chris Pratt visited patients in the Seattle Children's Hospital after the two made a bet that eventually raised donations for the hospital as well as Christopher's Haven. In May 2020, Evans organized a virtual fundraiser involving his Avengers co-stars to benefit the organizations Feeding America, Meals on Wheels, World Central Kitchen, and No Kid Hungry. The following year, he won $80,000 for Christopher's Haven by placing third in a charity fantasy football tournament with his Avengers co-stars.

== Awards and nominations ==
Awards and nominations received by Chris Evans
Award	Year	Work	Category	Result	Ref.
Broadway.com Audience Awards	2018	Lobby Hero	Favorite Featured Actor in a Play	Won	
Critics' Choice Movie Awards	2015	Captain America: The Winter Soldier	Best Actor in an Action Movie	Nominated	
Critics' Choice Movie Awards	2016	Captain America: Civil War	Best Actor in an Action Movie	Nominated	
Drama League Awards	2018	Lobby Hero	Distinguished Performance Award	Nominated	
Kids' Choice Awards	2015	Captain America: The Winter Soldier	Favorite Male Action Star	Nominated	
Kids' Choice Awards	2016	Avengers: Age of Ultron	Favorite Movie Actor	Nominated	
Kids' Choice Awards	2017	Captain America: Civil War	Favorite Movie Actor	Nominated	
Kids' Choice Awards	2017	Captain America: Civil War	Favorite Butt-Kicker	Won	
Kids' Choice Awards	2017	Captain America: Civil War	Favorite Frenemies (shared with Robert Downey Jr.)	Nominated	
Kids' Choice Awards	2017	Captain America: Civil War	#SQUAD (shared with cast)	Nominated	
Kids' Choice Awards	2019	Avengers: Infinity War	Favorite Movie Actor	Nominated	
Kids' Choice Awards	2019	Avengers: Infinity War	Favorite Superhero	Nominated	
Kids' Choice Awards	2020	Avengers: Endgame	Favorite Movie Actor	Nominated	
Kids' Choice Awards	2020	Avengers: Endgame	Favorite Superhero	Nominated	
Kids' Choice Awards	2023	Lightyear	Favorite Voice from an Animated Movie (Male)	Nominated	
Kids' Choice Awards	2025	Red One	Favorite Movie Actor	Nominated	
MTV Movie & TV Awards	2006	Fantastic Four	Best On Screen Team	Nominated	
MTV Movie & TV Awards	2012	Captain America: The First Avenger	Best Hero	Nominated	
MTV Movie & TV Awards	2013	The Avengers	Best Fight (shared with cast)	Won	
MTV Movie & TV Awards	2015	Captain America: The Winter Soldier	Best Fight (Evans vs. Sebastian Stan)	Nominated	
MTV Movie & TV Awards	2015	Captain America: The Winter Soldier	Best Kiss (shared with Scarlett Johansson)	Nominated	
MTV Movie & TV Awards	2016	Avengers: Age of Ultron	Best Hero	Nominated	
MTV Movie & TV Awards	2019	Avengers: Endgame	Best Fight (Evans vs. Josh Brolin)	Nominated	
People's Choice Awards	2012	Captain America: The First Avenger	Favorite Movie Superhero	Nominated	
People's Choice Awards	2013	The Avengers	Favorite Action Movie Star	Nominated	
People's Choice Awards	2013	The Avengers	Favorite Movie Superhero	Nominated	
People's Choice Awards	2015	Captain America: The Winter Soldier	Favorite Action Movie Actor	Won	
People's Choice Awards	2015	Captain America: The Winter Soldier	Favorite Movie Duo (shared with Scarlett Johansson)	Nominated	
People's Choice Awards	2017	Captain America: Civil War	Favorite Action Movie Actor	Nominated	
People's Choice Awards	2019	Avengers: Endgame	The Action Movie Star of 2019	Nominated	
Golden Raspberry Awards	2024	Ghosted	Worst Actor	Nominated	
Golden Raspberry Awards	2024	Ghosted	Worst Screen Combo (shared with Ana de Armas)	Nominated	
Saturn Awards	2012	Captain America: The First Avenger	Best Actor	Nominated	
Saturn Awards	2015	Captain America: The Winter Soldier	Best Actor	Nominated	
Saturn Awards	2017	Captain America: Civil War	Best Actor	Nominated	
Saturn Awards	2019	Avengers: Endgame	Best Actor	Nominated	
Scream Awards	2011	Captain America: The First Avenger	Best Science Fiction Actor	Nominated	
Scream Awards	2011	Captain America: The First Avenger	Best Superhero	Won	
Scream Awards	2011	Scott Pilgrim vs. the World	Best Villain (shared with Satya Bhabha, Brandon Routh, Mae Whitman, Shota Saito, Keita Saito and Jason Schwartzman)	Nominated	
Scream Awards	2011	Captain America: The First Avenger	Fight Scene of the Year Evans vs. Hugo Weaving	Nominated	
Teen Choice Awards	2007	Fantastic Four: Rise of the Silver Surfer	Choice Movie Actor: Action Adventure	Nominated	
Teen Choice Awards	2007	Fantastic Four: Rise of the Silver Surfer	Choice Movie: Rumble	Nominated	
Teen Choice Awards	2011	Captain America: The First Avenger	Choice Summer Movie Star: Male	Nominated	
Teen Choice Awards	2012	The Avengers	Choice Movie: Male Scene Stealer	Nominated	
Teen Choice Awards	2014	Captain America: The Winter Soldier	Choice Movie Actor: Sci-Fi/Fantasy	Nominated	
Teen Choice Awards	2014	Captain America: The Winter Soldier	Choice Movie: Chemistry (shared with Anthony Mackie)	Nominated	
Teen Choice Awards	2014	Captain America: The Winter Soldier	Choice Movie: Liplock (shared with Scarlett Johansson)	Nominated	
Teen Choice Awards	2015	Avengers: Age of Ultron	Choice Movie: Scene Stealer	Won	
Teen Choice Awards	2016	Captain America: Civil War	Choice Movie Actor: Sci-Fi/Fantasy	Won	
Teen Choice Awards	2016	Captain America: Civil War	Choice Movie: Chemistry (shared with Sebastian Stan, Anthony Mackie, Elizabeth Olsen and Jeremy Renner)	Nominated	
Teen Choice Awards	2016	Captain America: Civil War	Choice Movie: Liplock (shared with Emily VanCamp)	Nominated	
Teen Choice Awards	2017	Gifted	Choice Movie Actor: Drama	Nominated	
Teen Choice Awards	2018	Avengers: Infinity War	Choice Action Movie Actor	Nominated	
Teen Choice Awards	2019	Avengers: Endgame	Choice Action Movie Actor	Nominated	
Young Hollywood Awards	2014	Captain America: The Winter Soldier	Super Superhero	Nominated	
