= Internet begging =

Asking people for money online

Internet begging, cyber-begging, e-begging or Internet panhandling is the online version of traditional begging, asking strangers for money to meet basic needs such as food and shelter.

Internet begging among strangers differs from street begging in that it can be practiced with relative anonymity, thereby eliminating or reducing the shame and disgrace apparent of begging in public. Internet begging is also commonly done among acquaintances on social media platforms, such as requests for donations from friends and family members to pay for normal educational expenses.

A cause website is a cyber-begging site that presents a personal appeal for funds or help.

== History ==
During the early days of the Internet, cyber-begging was evident in the form of personal advertisements for help on local bulletin board systems (BBS). As personal websites became more popular, individuals began advertising their needs using the features available through website authoring. Many Internet service providers (ISPs) offered a free homepage along with the basic dial-up connection service to the Internet. For many people, this was an opportunity to create an inexpensive website to host and share their personal experience and need.

As non-profit organizations began moving their fundraising efforts from snail mail (postal mail) to the World Wide Web, individuals began to create more elaborate forms of personal 'fundraising' by utilizing many of the same Internet techniques.

During the late 1990s, as the Internet became more sophisticated, resources became available allowing any individual to create an attractive website without requiring the knowledge of HTML or other web authoring systems. These free-to-inexpensive web hosting services remain a constant on the Internet making it easy for the public to access, create and advertise an Internet begging website.

Internet begging gained notoriety and momentum after June 2002 when Karyn Bosnak started SaveKaryn.com as an attempt to have the Internet public help pay her credit card debt, which was in part due to her predilection for designer clothing and Starbucks coffee. For Bosnak, the results led to traditional media attention, appearances on popular television programs and a book. Her website was probably the first Internet begging site to gain wide exposure and it became the example for many to follow.

In October 2009, the Boston Globe carried a story on so-called cyberbegging, or Internet begging, which was reported to be a new trend worldwide.

== Internet begging sites ==
With hundreds of Internet begging sites on-line, it has become common practice for web beggars to register and own the domain name of their websites. Using free or inexpensive hosting services and specialized websites such as GoFundMe, Internet begging websites ask the public for help with many needs including breast augmentation surgery, cancer treatments, new cars, preventing personal homelessness, and medical bills to suggest a few. Websites with names reflecting their needs directly or indirectly are panhandling for help with a variety of human needs and conditions, from deeply personal to very humorous. Although sometimes labelled as crowdfunding, asking for help to cover funeral expenses has been uptrending.

Many 'cause websites' accept contributions via clickable hyperlinks. Internet services like PayPal and the Amazon.com Honor system offer free to inexpensive credit card and payment acceptance services making it easy for cyber-beggars to collect donations directly from their websites.

Many of the Internet begging websites appear to be the result of an individual's legitimate desire for attention and help. However, a new trend is emerging in 'Mega' begging sites that are ostensibly offering would be Internet beggars help with the details of website design, hosting and advertising.

Internet begging websites are essentially as transient as traditional off-line panhandlers with respect to territory and accessibility. Many Internet begging websites are not long lived.

== See also ==
- Save Karyn
- One red paperclip
- Begslist.org
- The Million Dollar Homepage
- Crowdfunding
