= List of roles and awards of Chris Pratt =

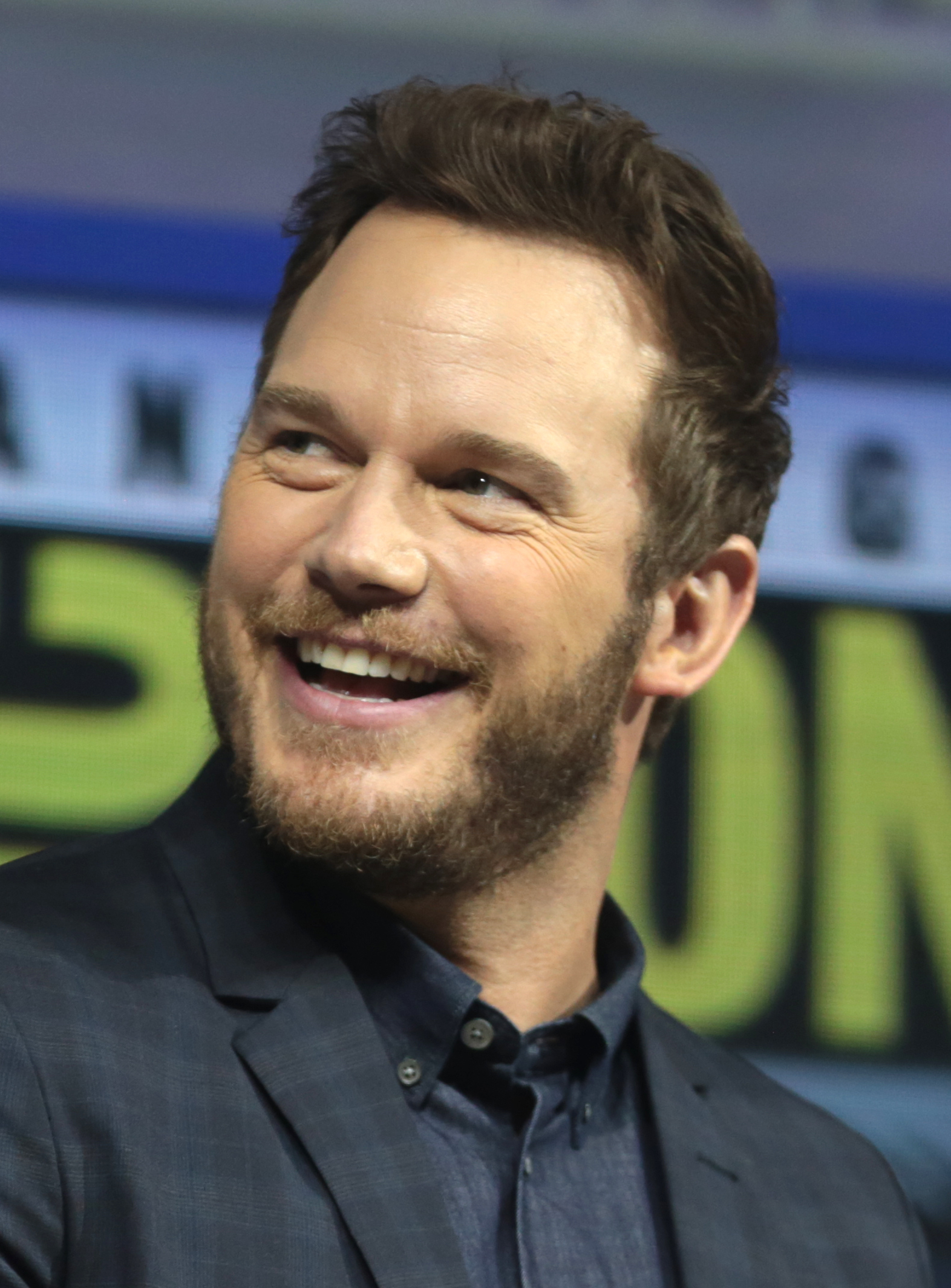
Pratt at the 2018 San Diego Comic Con International

American actor Chris Pratt began his film career with minor roles before securing a starring role in the drama series Everwood (2002–2006); he later had his breakthrough as Andy Dwyer in the NBC sitcom Parks and Recreation (2009–2015). Between 2009 and 2014, Pratt had supporting roles in several films, including the action thriller Wanted (2008), the sports biopic Moneyball (2011), and the romantic comedy Her (2013). Pratt received global recognition and established himself as a leading actor through his portrayal of Star-Lord in the Marvel Cinematic Universe from 2014 onwards.

Pratt achieved further critical and commercial success portraying Owen Grady in the Jurassic World franchise (2015–2022). His other starring roles include the films The Magnificent Seven (2016), Passengers (2016), The Tomorrow War (2021) and the action thriller television series The Terminal List (2022) and its prequel The Terminal List: Dark Wolf (2025). A voice actor, he has voiced characters in several successful films, including the Lego Movie franchise (2014–2019), Onward (2020), The Super Mario Bros. Movie (2023) and The Garfield Movie (2024).

== Film ==
Key
†	Denotes films that have not yet been released

Year	Title	Role	Notes
2000	Cursed Part 3	Devon	Short film
2003	The Extreme Team	Keenan	
2005	Strangers with Candy	Brason	
2007	Walk the Talk	Cam	
2008	Wieners	Bobby	
2008	Wanted	Barry	
2009	Bride Wars	Fletcher Flemson	
2009	Deep in the Valley	Lester Watts	
2009	Jennifer's Body	Roman Duda	
2009	The Multi-Hyphenate	Chris	Short film
2011	Take Me Home Tonight	Kyle Masterson	
2011	Moneyball	Scott Hatteberg	
2011	What's Your Number?	Disgusting Donald	
2011	10 Years	Cully	
2012	On the Mat	Narrator	Documentary; also executive producer
2012	The Five-Year Engagement	Alex Eilhauer	
2012	Zero Dark Thirty	Justin Lenihan	
2013	Movie 43	Doug	Segment: "The Proposition"
2013	Mr. Payback	Darren	Short film
2013	Delivery Man	Brett	
2013	Her	Paul	
2014	The Lego Movie	Emmet Brickowski	Voice
2014	Guardians of the Galaxy	Peter Quill / Star-Lord	
2015	Jurassic World	Owen Grady	
2015	Jem and the Holograms	Himself	Cameo
2016	The Magnificent Seven	Joshua Faraday	
2016	Passengers	James Preston / "Jim"	
2017	Guardians of the Galaxy Vol. 2	Peter Quill / Star-Lord	
2018	Avengers: Infinity War	Peter Quill / Star-Lord	
2018	Jurassic World: Fallen Kingdom	Owen Grady	
2018	Emmet's Holiday Party	Emmet Brickowski	Voice; short film
2019	The Lego Movie 2: The Second Part	Emmet Brickowski / Rex Dangervest	Voice
2019	The Kid	Grant Cutler	
2019	Avengers: Endgame	Peter Quill / Star-Lord	
2020	Onward	Barley Lightfoot	Voice
2021	Alaskan Nets	—N/a	Documentary; executive producer only
2021	The Tomorrow War	Dan Forester	Also executive producer
2022	Jurassic World Dominion	Owen Grady	
2022	Thor: Love and Thunder	Peter Quill / Star-Lord	
2023	Helen Believe	—N/a	Documentary; producer only
2023	The Super Mario Bros. Movie	Mario	Voice
2023	Guardians of the Galaxy Vol. 3	Peter Quill / Star-Lord	
2024	The Garfield Movie	Garfield	Voice
2024	Fighting Spirit: A Combat Chaplain's Journey	—N/a	Documentary; executive producer only
2025	The Electric State	John D. Keats	
2026	Mercy	Det. Christopher "Chris" Raven	
2026	The Super Mario Galaxy Movie	Mario	Voice
2026	Pétros Ení - Discovering the Origins	Narrator	Documentary
2026	Way of the Warrior Kid †	Uncle Jake	Post-production; also producer
2026	The Treveler †	TBA	

== Television ==
Year	Title	Role	Notes
2001	The Huntress	Nick Owens	Episode: "Who Are You?"
2002–2006	Everwood	Bright Abbott	Main role (89 episodes)
2004	I Love the '90s	Himself	Commentator; Documentary miniseries
2005	Path of Destruction	Nathan McCain	Television film
2006–2007	The O.C.	Winchester "Ché" Cook	Recurring role (9 episodes)
2008	The Batman	Jake	Voice; episode: "Attack of the Terrible Trio"
2009–2015, 2020	Parks and Recreation	Andy Dwyer	Main role (116 episodes)
2010, 2011	Ben 10: Ultimate Alien	Cooper Daniels	Voice (2 episodes)
2012	Top Chef: Seattle	Himself	Episode: "Even the Famous Come Home"
2014	Saturday Night Live	Himself	Host; episode: "Chris Pratt/Ariana Grande"
2017	Mom	Nick Banaszak	Episode: "Good Karma and the Big Weird"
2022–present	The Terminal List	James Reece	Lead role; also executive producer
2022	The Guardians of the Galaxy Holiday Special	Peter Quill / Star-Lord	Television special
2023	Marvel Studios: Assembled	Himself	Episode: "The Making of Guardians of the Galaxy Vol. 3 "
2025	The Terminal List: Dark Wolf	James Reece	Main role; also executive producer
TBA	The Earliest Show	TBA	

== Video games ==
Year	Title	Voice role
2010	Ben 10 Ultimate Alien: Cosmic Destruction	Cooper
2014	The Lego Movie Videogame	Emmet Brickowski
2015	Lego Jurassic World	Owen Grady
2015	Lego Dimensions	Emmet Brickowski / Owen Grady

== Theme park attractions ==
Year	Attraction	Location	Role
2017	Guardians of the Galaxy – Mission: Breakout!	Disney California Adventure	Peter Quill / Star-Lord
2018	Disney's Candlelight Processional	Disneyland	Himself (guest narrator)
2019	Jurassic World: The Ride	Universal Studios Hollywood	Owen Grady
2021	VelociCoaster	Universal Islands of Adventure	Owen Grady
2021	Jurassic World Adventure	Universal Studios Beijing	Owen Grady
2022	Guardians of the Galaxy: Cosmic Rewind	Epcot	Peter Quill / Star-Lord
2024	Studio Tour	Universal Studios Hollywood	Himself / Owen Grady

== Awards and nominations ==
Year	Association	Category	Nominated work	Result	Ref.
2004	Teen Choice Awards	Choice TV Sidekick	Everwood	Nominated	
2005	Teen Choice Awards	Choice TV Sidekick	Everwood	Nominated	
2012	Washington D.C. Area Film Critics Association	Best Acting Ensemble	Zero Dark Thirty	Nominated	
2013	Critics' Choice Television Award	Best Supporting Actor in a Comedy Series	Parks and Recreation	Nominated	
2014	CinemaCon Awards	Breakthrough Performer of the Year	—N/a	Won	
2014	Young Hollywood Awards	Super Superhero	Guardians of the Galaxy	Nominated	
2014	Detroit Film Critics Society	Best Ensemble	Guardians of the Galaxy	Won	
2014	Detroit Film Critics Society	Breakthrough Performance	Guardians of the Galaxy	Nominated	
2015	Critics' Choice Movie Awards	Best Actor in an Action Movie	Guardians of the Galaxy	Nominated	
2015	MTV Movie Awards	Best Male Performance	Guardians of the Galaxy	Nominated	
2015	MTV Movie Awards	Best Shirtless Performance	Guardians of the Galaxy	Nominated	
2015	MTV Movie Awards	Best Musical Moment	Guardians of the Galaxy	Nominated	
2015	MTV Movie Awards	Best Comedic Performance	Guardians of the Galaxy	Nominated	
2015	MTV Movie Awards	Best Hero	Guardians of the Galaxy	Nominated	
2015	Kids' Choice Awards	Favorite Male Action Star	Guardians of the Galaxy	Nominated	
2015	Saturn Awards	Best Actor	Guardians of the Galaxy	Won	
2015	Teen Choice Awards	Choice Summer Movie Star: Male	Jurassic World	Nominated	
2016	People's Choice Awards	Favorite Movie Actor	Jurassic World	Nominated	
2016	People's Choice Awards	Favorite Action Movie Actor	Jurassic World	Nominated	
2016	Critics' Choice Movie Awards	Best Actor in an Action Movie	Jurassic World	Nominated	
2016	Kids' Choice Awards	Favorite Movie Actor	Jurassic World	Nominated	
2016	MTV Movie Awards	Best Male Performance	Jurassic World	Nominated	
2016	MTV Movie Awards	Best Action Performance	Jurassic World	Won	
2016	Teen Choice Awards	Choice Movie: AnTEENcipated Actor	The Magnificent Seven	Nominated	
2017	Saturn Awards	Best Actor	Passengers	Nominated	
2017	Teen Choice Awards	Choice Movie Actor: Sci-Fi	Guardians of the Galaxy Vol. 2	Won	
2017	Teen Choice Awards	Choice Movie: Ship (with Zoe Saldaña)	Guardians of the Galaxy Vol. 2	Nominated	
2018	MTV Movie & TV Awards	MTV Generation Award	—N/a	Won	
2018	Teen Choice Awards	Choice Liplock (with Zoe Saldaña)	Avengers: Infinity War	Nominated	
2018	Teen Choice Awards	Choice Summer Movie Actor	Jurassic World: Fallen Kingdom	Won	
2018	People's Choice Awards	The Male Movie Star of 2018	Jurassic World: Fallen Kingdom	Nominated	
2018	People's Choice Awards	The Action Movie Star of 2018	Jurassic World: Fallen Kingdom	Nominated	
2019	Kids' Choice Awards	Favorite Butt-Kicker	Jurassic World: Fallen Kingdom	Won	
2019	People's Choice Awards	The Animated Movie Star of 2019	The Lego Movie 2: The Second Part	Nominated	
2020	Kids' Choice Awards	Favorite Male Voice from an Animated Movie	The Lego Movie 2: The Second Part	Nominated	
2021	Critics' Choice Super Awards	Best Voice Actor in an Animated Movie	Onward	Nominated	
2021	Kids' Choice Awards	Favorite Voice from an Animated Movie	Onward	Nominated	
2021	People's Choice Awards	The Male Movie Star of 2021	The Tomorrow War	Nominated	
2021	People's Choice Awards	The Action Movie Star of 2021	The Tomorrow War	Nominated	
2022	People's Choice Awards	Male Movie Star of 2022	Jurassic World Dominion	Nominated	
2022	People's Choice Awards	Action Movie Star of 2022	Jurassic World Dominion	Nominated	
2023	Kids' Choice Awards	Favorite Movie Actor	Jurassic World Dominion	Nominated	
2024	Saturn Awards	Best Actor in a film	Guardians of the Galaxy Vol. 3	Nominated	
2024	People's Choice Awards	The Male Movie Star of the Year	Guardians of the Galaxy Vol. 3	Nominated	
2024	People's Choice Awards	The Action Movie Star of the Year	Guardians of the Galaxy Vol. 3	Nominated	
2024	Kids' Choice Awards	Favorite Movie Actor	Guardians of the Galaxy Vol. 3	Nominated	
2024	Kids' Choice Awards	Favorite Male Voice from an Animated Movie	The Super Mario Bros. Movie	Nominated	
2025	Kids' Choice Awards	Favorite Movie Actor	The Electric State	Nominated	
2026	Kids' Choice Awards	Favorite Male Animated Voice from a Movie	The Super Mario Galaxy Movie	Nominated	
