= List of Chris Evans performances =

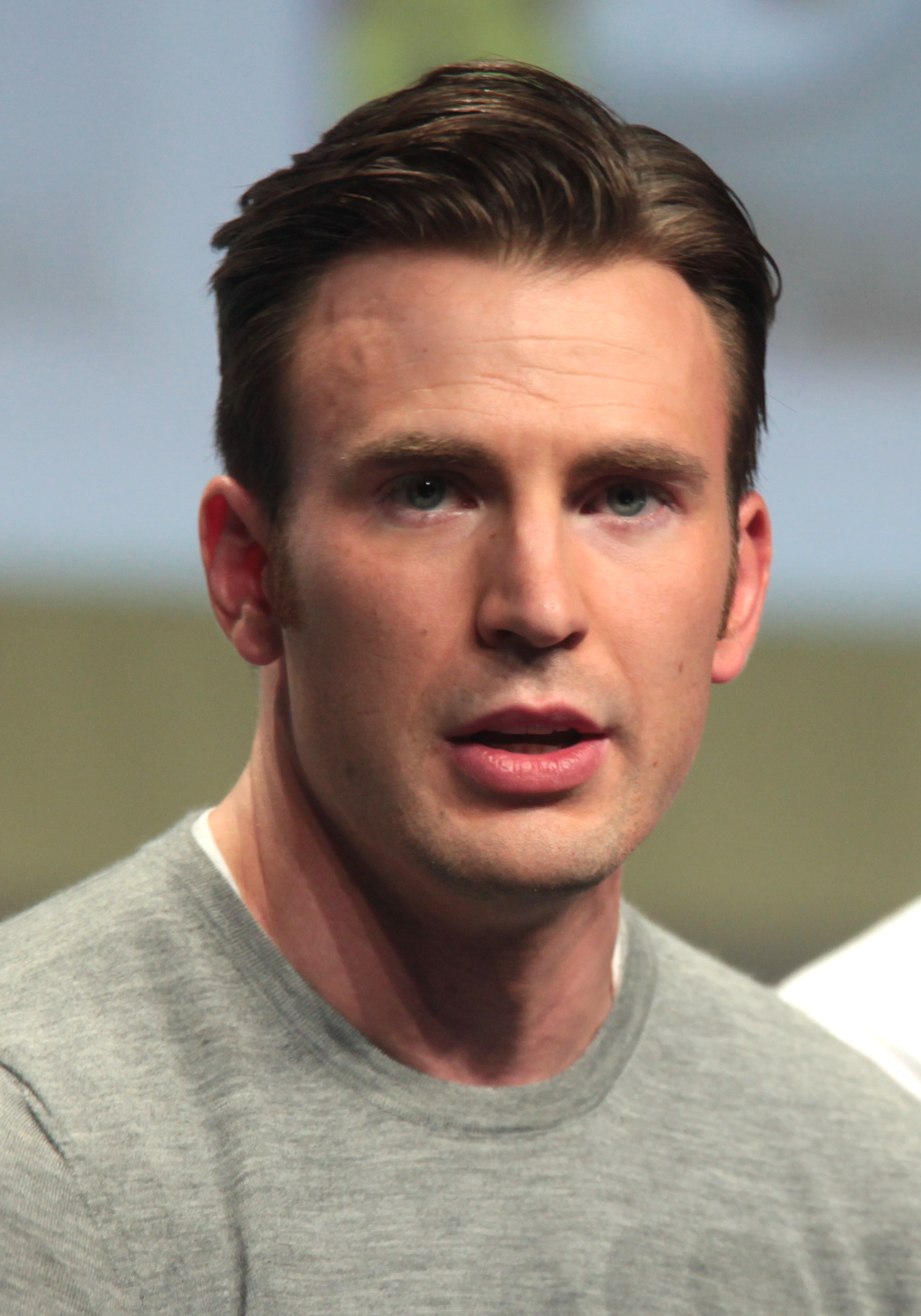
Evans at the 2014 San Diego Comic-Con

Chris Evans is an American actor who made his film debut in Biodiversity: Wild About Life!, a 1997 educational film co-produced by the National Fish and Wildlife Foundation, before making appearances in minor television roles in the early 2000s. Evans has described his filmography of the early to mid 2000s as being "really terrible". He appeared in the television comedy-drama Opposite Sex (2000), comedies Not Another Teen Movie (2001) and The Perfect Score (2004), and the action thriller Cellular (2004).

In 2005, Evans had his breakthrough performance as Johnny Storm / Human Torch in the superhero film Fantastic Four, his highest-paid role at the time, and reprised the role for the film's 2007 sequel Fantastic Four: Rise of the Silver Surfer. Fantastic Four would be the first of many roles in films adapted from comic books and graphic novels for Evans, including Casey Jones in TMNT (2007), Jake Jensen in The Losers (2010), Lucas Lee in Scott Pilgrim vs. the World (2010), and Curtis Everett in Snowpiercer (2013). His most prolific comic book movie role would be as Steve Rogers (Captain America) in the Marvel Cinematic Universe (MCU) series of films, with credited appearances and cameos as the character in eleven films and one video game; notable appearances include the headlining films Captain America: The First Avenger (2011), Captain America: The Winter Soldier (2014), and Captain America: Civil War (2016), and the ensemble films The Avengers (2012), Avengers: Age of Ultron (2015), Avengers: Infinity War (2018), and Avengers: Endgame (2019). He is slated to reprise his role in Avengers: Doomsday (2026) and Avengers: Secret Wars (2027).

While comic book films formed the bulk of Evans's filmography from the late 2000s through the entirety of the 2010s, he concurrently acted in a range of non-comic book projects, including Danny Boyle's psychological thriller Sunshine (2007), Marc Webb's drama Gifted (2017), and a critically acclaimed performance in Rian Johnson's Knives Out (2019). He also starred in several romantic comedy films, including The Nanny Diaries (2007), What's Your Number? (2011), and Playing It Cool (2015), the latter of which he also executive produced. Evans made his directorial debut in 2014 with the romantic drama Before We Go, which he also produced and starred in. His Broadway debut was in the 2018 revival of Kenneth Lonergan's play Lobby Hero, for which he was nominated for a Drama League Award. Throughout the 2020s, he has appeared in multiple films and series that have debuted on streaming services, including Defending Jacob (2020), The Gray Man (2022), and Ghosted (2023).

== Film ==
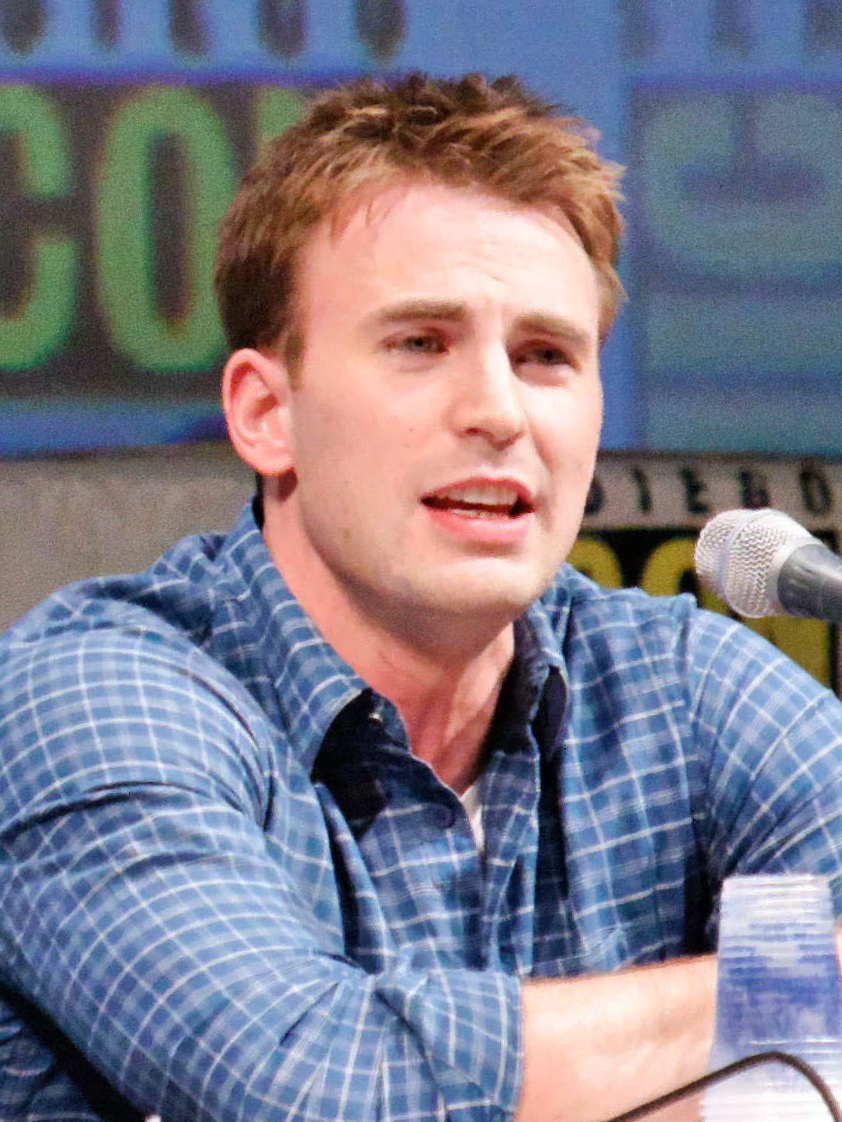
At a panel for Captain America: The First Avenger at the 2011 San Diego Comic-Con

Key
| † | Denotes films that have not yet been released |

| Year | Title | Role | Notes | Ref(s) |
|---|---|---|---|---|
| 1997 | Biodiversity: Wild About Life! | Rick | Educational film | |
| 2000 | The Newcomers | Judd | | |
| 2001 | Not Another Teen Movie | Jake Wyler | | |
| 2003 | Paper Boy | Ben | Short film | |
| 2004 | The Perfect Score | Kyle | | |
| 2004 | The Orphan King | Seth | Unreleased | |
| 2004 | Cellular | Ryan | | |
| 2005 | Fierce People | Bryce Langley | | |
| 2005 | London | Syd | | |
| 2005 | Fantastic Four | Johnny Storm / Human Torch | | |
| 2007 | Fantastic Four: Rise of the Silver Surfer | Johnny Storm / Human Torch | | |
| 2007 | TMNT | Casey Jones | Voice role | |
| 2007 | Sunshine | James Mace | | |
| 2007 | The Nanny Diaries | "Harvard Hottie" (Hayden) | | |
| 2007 | Battle for Terra | Stewart Stanton | Voice role | |
| 2008 | Street Kings | Paul Diskant | | |
| 2008 | The Loss of a Teardrop Diamond | Jimmy Dobyne | | |
| 2009 | Push | Nick Gant | | |
| 2010 | The Losers | Jensen | | |
| 2010 | Scott Pilgrim vs. the World | Lucas Lee | | |
| 2011 | Puncture | Mike Weiss | | |
| 2011 | What's Your Number? | Colin Shea | | |
| 2011 | Captain America: The First Avenger | Steve Rogers / Captain America | | |
| 2012 | The Avengers | Steve Rogers / Captain America | | |
| 2012 | The Iceman | Robert Pronge | | |
| 2013 | Snowpiercer | Curtis Everett | | |
| 2013 | Thor: The Dark World | Loki as Captain America | Uncredited cameo | |
| 2014 | Captain America: The Winter Soldier | Steve Rogers / Captain America | | |
| 2014 | Before We Go | Nick Vaughan | Also director and producer | |
| 2015 | Playing It Cool | Me | Also executive producer | |
| 2015 | Avengers: Age of Ultron | Steve Rogers / Captain America | | |
| 2015 | Ant-Man | Steve Rogers / Captain America | Uncredited cameo, post-credits scene | |
| 2016 | Captain America: Civil War | Steve Rogers / Captain America | | |
| 2017 | Gifted | Frank Adler | | |
| 2017 | Spider-Man: Homecoming | Steve Rogers / Captain America | Cameo | |
| 2018 | Avengers: Infinity War | Steve Rogers / Captain America | | |
| 2019 | Captain Marvel | Steve Rogers / Captain America | Uncredited cameo, mid-credits scene | |
| 2019 | Superpower Dogs | Henry | Voice role, documentary | |
| 2019 | Avengers: Endgame | Steve Rogers / Captain America | Also in 2026 extended version | |
| 2019 | The Red Sea Diving Resort | Ari Levinson | | |
| 2019 | Knives Out | Hugh "Ransom" Drysdale | | |
| 2021 | Free Guy | Himself | Cameo | |
| 2021 | Don't Look Up | Devin Peters | Uncredited cameo | |
| 2022 | Lightyear | Buzz Lightyear | Voice role | |
| 2022 | The Gray Man | Lloyd Hansen | | |
| 2023 | Ghosted | Cole Turner | Also producer | |
| 2023 | Pain Hustlers | Pete Brenner | | |
| 2024 | Deadpool & Wolverine | Johnny Storm / Human Torch | | |
| 2024 | Red One | Jack "the Wolf" O'Malley | | |
| 2025 | Honey Don't! | Reverend Drew Devlin | | |
| 2025 | Materialists | John Pitts | | |
| 2025 | Sacrifice | Mike Tyler | | |
| 2026 | Avengers: Doomsday † | Steve Rogers / Nomad | Post-production | |
| TBA | My Darling California † | Jack Normandie | Filming | |

== Television ==
| Year | Title | Role | Notes | Ref. |
|---|---|---|---|---|
| 2000 | Opposite Sex | Cary | 8 episodes | |
| 2000 | The Fugitive | Zack Lardner | Episode: "Guilt" | |
| 2000 | Just Married | Josh | Unaired | |
| 2001 | Boston Public | Neil Mavromates | Episode: "Chapter Nine" | |
| 2002 | Eastwick | Adam | Unaired pilot | |
| 2003 | Skin | Brian | Episode: "Pilot" | |
| 2008 | Robot Chicken | Various voices | Episode: "Monstourage" | |
| 2015 | America's Game: The 2014 New England Patriots | Narrator | Documentary | |
| 2017 | America's Game: The 2016 New England Patriots | Narrator | Documentary | |
| 2018 | Chain of Command | Narrator | Documentary series | |
| 2020 | Defending Jacob | Andy Barber | 8 episodes, also executive producer | |
| 2023 | Scott Pilgrim Takes Off | Lucas Lee | Voice role, 8 episodes | |

== Video games ==
| Year | Title | Role | Developer | Ref |
|---|---|---|---|---|
| 2005 | Fantastic Four | Johnny Storm / Human Torch | 7 Studios | |
| 2011 | Captain America: Super Soldier | Steve Rogers / Captain America | Next Level Games | |
| 2012 | Discovered | Himself | Microsoft, Intel | |

== Stage ==
| Year | Production | Role | Venue | Notes | Ref. |
|---|---|---|---|---|---|
| 2017 | Our Town | Mr. Charles Webb | Fox Theatre | Benefit reading | |
| 2018 | Lobby Hero | Bill | Helen Hayes Theatre | Broadway | |

== Music videos ==
| Year | Title | Performer | Role | Album | Ref. |
|---|---|---|---|---|---|
| 2001 | "Tainted Love" | Marilyn Manson | Jake Wyler | Not Another Teen Movie: Music from the Motion Picture and The Golden Age of Grotesque | |

== Web ==
| Year | Title | Role | Ref. |
|---|---|---|---|
| 2009 | 28 Drinks Later | Himself | |
| 2012 | The Carlton Dance | Himself | |
