= Begslist.org =

Online donations website

Begslist, Inc.
- Founded: 2007
- Headquarters: Chicago, Illinois, United States
- Key people: Rex Camposagrado, Founder
- Industry: Internet, Charity
- Products: Online Begging
- Website: www.Begslist.org

Begslist, Inc. is an Internet begging and online donation website. It is the online version of traditional begging or panhandling via the Internet and a way for people to get help with their financial problems through begging online, a practice known as "cyberbegging" or "digital panhandling". Begslist allows visitors to post their pleas for help on the website in the hopes to receive donations. PayPal buttons are added to each of the postings for readers to send donations to those asking for help through secured payments and money transfers through the Internet.

== History ==
Begslist.org was founded in 2007 by Rex Camposagrado and was originally started as a blog called begslist.blogspot.com. He created the site to help people who wanted to ask for help by getting donations anonymously; avoiding the embarrassment of having to beg in person or for those trying to find another alternative avenue to finding help any way they could.

Camposagrado created Begslist after losing his business and he fell on hard times. He never saw himself as the kind of person to beg for help, but decided to seek help online due to his financial crunch. Begslist earns money from advertisements and does not charge a fee to users.

== Affiliates ==
Begslist was originally a blog called begslist.blogspot.com. It still exists; however, instead of pleas for help, it is mostly related to articles about the homeless, charities, resources to get help and donation news.

== See also ==
- Begging
- Save Karyn
