= Eric Ogden =

Eric Ogden may refer to:

- Eric Ogden (photographer), American photographer
- Eric Ogden (politician) (1923–1997), British politician
