= Hollywood Chrises =

Set of actors with same first name

The Hollywood Chrises is a nickname given to four actors known for their work in blockbuster films during the 21st century, who all share the first name Chris shortened from Christopher. They are Chris Evans, Chris Hemsworth, Chris Pine, and Chris Pratt.

== Origins ==
Each of the four actors were born around the same time, with Pratt (born in 1979) being the oldest, and Hemsworth (born in 1983) being the youngest. They would all begin their acting careers in the 2000s, with their first shared credit being Star Trek (2009), in which Hemsworth (in his film debut) played George Kirk, the father of protagonist James T. Kirk played by Pine.

The term began to become commonplace in the latter half of the 2010s, spurred largely by their roles in the Marvel Cinematic Universe. Three of the actors would portray major characters in the franchise - Hemsworth as Thor, Evans as Captain America, and Pratt as Star-Lord. Within these films, Hemsworth and Evans appear together in The Avengers (2012), Thor: The Dark World (2013), Avengers: Age of Ultron (2015), and the forthcoming Avengers: Doomsday (2026); Hemsworth and Pratt appear together in Thor: Love and Thunder (2022); and all three appear together in Avengers: Infinity War (2018) and Avengers: Endgame (2019). Hemsworth also appears via archival footage in the 2024 installment Deadpool & Wolverine, in which Evans portrays Johnny Storm / Human Torch; following Storm's death in the film, the character Deadpool responds by saying of Evans, "Not my favorite Chris" as a reference to the nickname. Pine does not appear in the franchise, but does have a voice role in the related Marvel Comics film Spider-Man: Into the Spider-Verse (2018); subsequently, there has never been a film in which all four actors have appeared together. Cardboard cutouts of Pratt, Evans and Pine were featured in the non Marvel Comics animated film, Teenage Mutant Ninja Turtles: Mutant Mayhem (2023).

A trend on social media is to try ranking the actors based on their physical attractiveness and their acting and comedic abilities. An article by The Independent opined that the selection of the four actors "confers something about the interchangeability of the modern Hollywood leading man", noting how all of them are Caucasian and roughly the same age, and indicated that some social media users suggested balancing out the homogeny of the four actors with those that do not meet the same criteria, such as Chris Messina, Chris Rock, and Chris Tucker.

== Reactions ==
During his opening monologue while hosting Saturday Night Live on May 6, 2017, Pine performed a skit explaining the differences between himself and the other Chrises. Vanity Fair indicated that this sketch may have been what ultimately led to the nickname becoming as popular as it did. Pratt and Hemsworth had previously hosted Saturday Night Live in 2014 and 2015 respectively; Evans has never appeared on the show.

In a 2020 interview with Men's Health, Pratt was asked about the common sentiment on social media that he is the "worst Chris", which he attributed to a 2018 acceptance speech expressing his Christian faith. Pratt also said that he does not like being called "Chris", instead preferring to be called by his initials "CP".

== See also ==
- List of Marvel Cinematic Universe film actors
