= Save Karyn =

Save Karyn is the name of both a Web site and a book. SaveKaryn.com was the first notable cyberbegging site. Save Karyn: One Shopaholic’s Journey to Debt and Back is the book chronicling the events leading up to and through the height of the site's popularity.

The creator of both works is Karyn Bosnak, originally a television producer, raised in the U.S. state of Illinois, who has lived much of her adult life in the greater New York City area. Up until 2000, she had a relatively high-paying job, and wasn't really concerned about going into debt to feed her affection for buying designer-label products. However, when she was laid off, her credit card debt of more than $20,000 started looming larger every month she was unable to find steady employment.

== Site beginnings ==
In the summer of 2002, Bosnak registered the Internet domain name savekaryn.com, and launched the site to request voluntary donations from the public. It had occurred to Bosnak that if she could receive just a few donations of several thousand dollars from a few wealthy people, or thousands of donations of one dollar from average-income people, she could pay off her debts. She reasoned that any amount given would be relatively insignificant to the donor, but if she found enough donors, the aggregate would be quite significant to her. An early version of the site announced "WANTED: $20,000. CREDIT CARDS ARE BAD. Hello! My name is Karyn, I’m really nice and I’m asking for your help! You see, I have this huge credit card debt and I need $20,000 to pay it off. So if you have an extra buck or two, please send it my way... Together we can banish credit card debt from my life." Her request echoed the matter-of-fact style of her initial plea to the online community, which she had made using craigslist.org.

Bosnak was not the first individual to openly solicit voluntary donations via the Internet; documented examples go back at least as far as 1998. However, she was one of the first to have a clearly defined goal (rather than "I want money", she stated that she needed a specific amount to eliminate her credit card debt). She regularly updated the site with amounts received and progress made toward her goal.

== Growing the site ==
Bosnak added a number of features to the site, including both ways she was saving money, as well as suggestions of other ways people could save money. While it was operational in its original form, she worked about 12 hours a day at her primary job and spent hours every night working on the website.

Throughout the summer and latter half of 2002, as word of the site spread, it received ever-growing press coverage, including mentions on CNN, a spot on The Today Show, and articles in various domestic and international newspapers and magazines. The site also attracted numerous Internet detractors and critics, most notably a parody site entitled "Don't Save Karyn".

Bosnak contends that her efforts could be more closely compared to a street performer than a panhandler, as her regular candid, and often humorous, writings on her site (continued in her book) provided an entertainment value that was unmatched by other solicitation sites. Bosnak said that many of the gifts she received on the website came with a note to explain that the reader was giving her money for the entertainment value that she had provided.

== The site after the goal was reached ==
Bosnak received about $13,000 in gifts on the site over the course of about 20 weeks. She paid off the rest of her debts by selling used goods on eBay and saving money that she earned from her job. Once she had paid off her debts, as promised, she stopped accepting donations; instead, she added links to other sites belonging to other people with specific needs.

== The book ==
The book chronicling her site's success has been very popular, and has already been translated into Dutch, Mandarin, German, Japanese, Thai, Russian, Korean and Croatian. With the proceeds from the book, she donated the original $13,000 that she received in gifts to an unspecified charity.

== The aftermath ==
As discussed near the end of the book, in 2003, Bosnak signed a deal with a Sony subsidiary for the rights to a movie chronicling her rise to fame. As of September 2026, no movie has been produced.
