= What's Your Number? =

2011 romantic comedy film directed by Mark Mylod

- Theatrical release poster
- Directed by: Mark Mylod
- Screenplay by: Gabrielle Allan; Jennifer Crittenden
- Based on: 20 Times a Lady by Karyn Bosnak
- Produced by: Beau Flynn; Tripp Vinson
- Starring: Anna Faris; Chris Evans; Ari Graynor; Blythe Danner
- Cinematography: J. Michael Muro
- Edited by: Julie Monroe
- Music by: Aaron Zigman
- Production companies: Contrafilm; Regency Enterprises
- Distributed by: 20th Century Fox
- Release date: September 30, 2011
- Running time: 106 minutes
- Country: United States
- Language: English
- Budget: $20 million
- Box office: $30.4 million

What's Your Number? is a 2011 American romantic comedy film directed by Mark Mylod, starring Anna Faris and Chris Evans. Written by Gabrielle Allan and Jennifer Crittenden, the film is based on Karyn Bosnak's book 20 Times a Lady.

It was released on September 30, 2011.

== Plot ==
In Boston, Ally Darling is a 30-something woman, struggling to make better life decisions. Her boyfriend Rick breaks up with her when she asks him to attend her sister Daisy's wedding, and she then gets laid off. On the subway home, Ally comes across a Marie Claire article entitled "What's Your Number?", which says that women who have more than 20 lovers in their lifetime have difficulty finding a husband.

After making a list of all the men she slept with, Ally realizes she is at 19, making her decide not to have sex with anyone else until she finds "the one". This lasts all of a few hours when she wakes up after Daisy's bachelorette party and discovers that she hooked up with her ex-boss Roger while drunk.

Hoping to avoid an awkward confrontation, Ally lets her musician neighbor Colin Shea into her apartment so that Roger will leave. It turns out that Colin was only over to avoid a girl he just slept with, because he does not want to give the women he sees any expectations.

Ally then runs into "Disgusting Donald", her once overweight ex-boyfriend, now successful and attractive, with his fiancée. She decides to track down all her exes hoping that one will have grown into the man she wants to marry, and therefore the number of men she has slept with will never increase. Ally gets help from Colin, who is skilled in "digging up dirt", to find all her exes in exchange for letting him come to her place after his one-night stands. She asks him to pay particular attention to one ex, Jake Adams, who Ally sees as "the one that got away".

Things do not quite work as Ally hoped and, one-by-one, she remembers why it did not work out with each. It ranged from one being in the same job since their break-up to another requiring her to pretend to be British. Depressed after the failed meetings, Ally has a night out with Colin culminating in their growing closer and almost having sex. She stops him, but invites him to be her date to Daisy's wedding.

Daisy and Ally's friends worry she is falling for Colin, warning and reminding her of his promiscuous nature. She is later infuriated to find out he had found Jake Adams' contact details but withheld them. Colin did so, believing they were becoming an item, so they have a falling-out.

Ally successfully contacts Jake, and they begin to date again. She takes him to her sister's wedding while Colin and his band perform at a different one. Dancing with her dad at the reception, he makes her realize that her happiness lies in being herself. (Not pleasing her mom, who wants her to marry Jake Adams.) Dancing with Jake, Ally confesses her "number" ("body count") to Jake, and he, thinking she is joking, expresses disgust at the thought.

Ally quickly realizes her true feelings lie with Colin and she and Jake are incompatible, so she breaks it off with him. In doing so, she casts aside her fears (in principle) over her number. Ally then goes around the city to numerous weddings to find Colin and confess her feelings, which he reciprocates.

Waking up with Colin the next morning, Ally gets a call from an old fling telling her that they in fact did not sleep together. Ally rejoices in the fact that Colin is indeed the 20th and hopefully last (ongoing) man, with whom she will ever be.

== Cast ==
- Anna Faris as Ally Darling
  - Nadine Jacobson as Ally (age 14)
- Chris Evans as Colin Shea
- Ari Graynor as Daisy Anne Darling
- Dave Annable as Jake Adams
  - Colby Parsons as Jake (age 14)
- Joel McHale as Roger the Boss
- Ed Begley, Jr. as Mr. Darling
- Blythe Danner as Ava Darling
- Heather Burns as Eileen
- Eliza Coupe as Sheila
- Kate Simses as Katie
- Tika Sumpter as Jamie
- Oliver Jackson-Cohen as Eddie Vogel
- Chris Pratt as Disgusting Donald
- Denise Vasi as Cara
- Zachary Quinto as Rick
- Mike Vogel as Dave Hansen
- Martin Freeman as Simon
- Andy Samberg as Gerry Perry
- Thomas Lennon as Dr. Barrett Ingold
- Anthony Mackie as Tom Piper
- Ivana Miličević as Jacinda
- Aziz Ansari as Jay

== Box office ==
What's Your Number? grossed $14 million in the United States and Canada and $16.4 million in other territories, for a total gross of $30.4 million against a budget of $20 million. It grossed $5.4 million in its opening weekend, finishing 8th at the box office.

== Reception ==
On the review aggregator website Rotten Tomatoes, 23% of 115 critics' reviews are positive, with an average rating of 4.24/10. The website's consensus reads: "The comic timing of Anna Faris is sharp as always, but it is wasted away in this predictable, boilerplate comedy." Metacritic, which uses a weighted average, assigned the film a score of 35 out of 100, based on 31 critics, indicating "generally unfavorable" reviews. Audiences polled by CinemaScore gave the film an average grade of "B" on an A+ to F scale.
