= Chris Pratt =

American actor (born 1979)

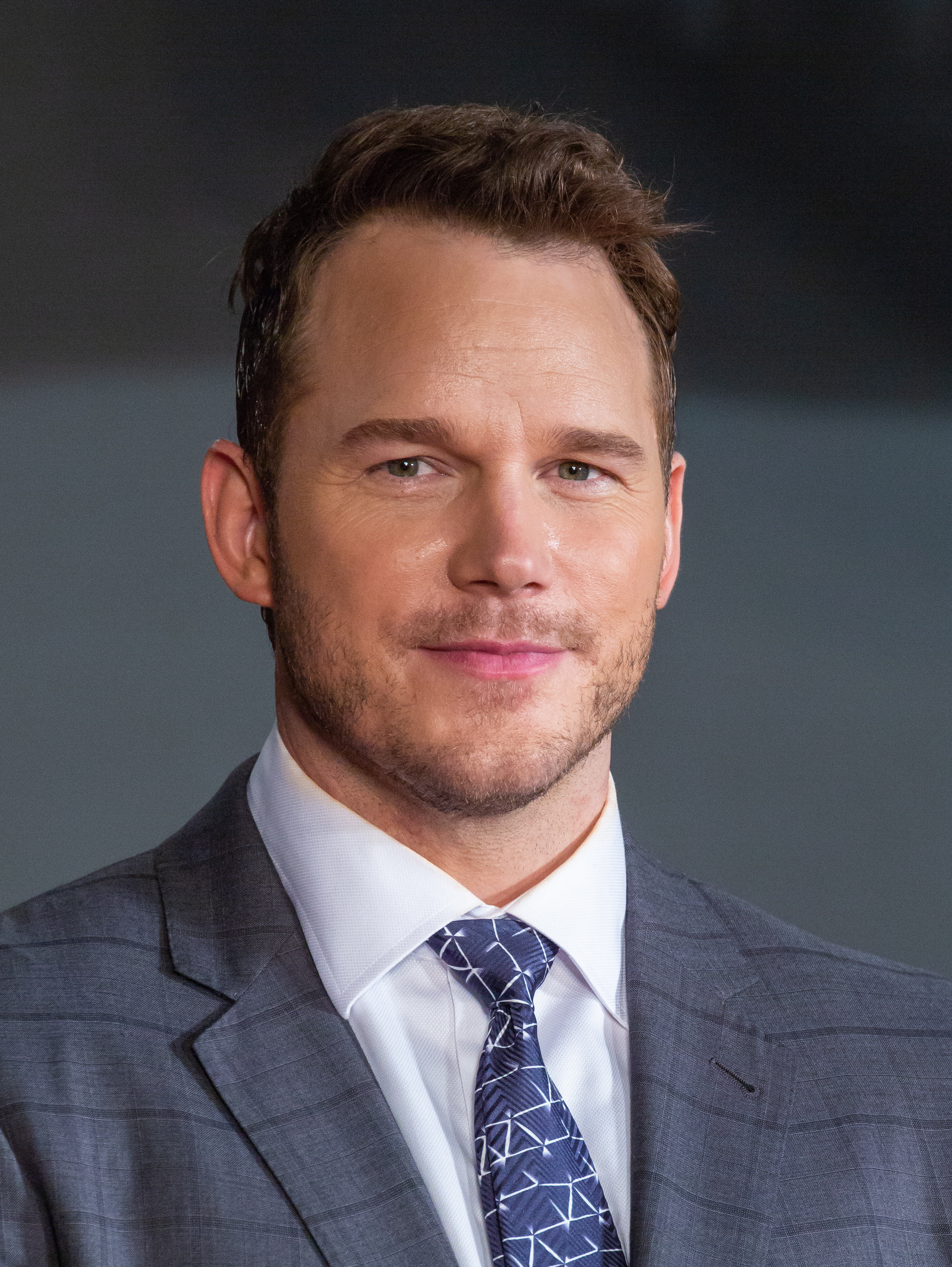
- Pratt in 2018
- Born: Christopher Michael Pratt; June 21, 1979 (age 47); Virginia, Minnesota, U.S.
- Occupations: Actor; producer
- Years active: 2000–present
- Spouses: Anna Faris (m. 2009; div. 2018); Katherine Schwarzenegger (m. 2019)
- Children: 4
- Relatives: Maria Shriver (mother-in-law); Shriver family (in-laws); Arnold Schwarzenegger (father-in-law); Schwarzenegger family (in-laws)

Christopher Michael Pratt (born June 21, 1979) is an American actor and producer. His films as a leading actor have grossed over $15.2 billion worldwide, making him one of the highest-grossing film stars of all time. Pratt was one of the world's highest-paid actors annually from 2015 to 2017. Through starring in blockbuster franchises and big-budget films, he has established himself as one of Hollywood's most bankable stars.

Pratt began his film career with minor roles before securing a starring role in the drama series Everwood (2002–2006). He had his breakthrough role as Andy Dwyer in the NBC sitcom Parks and Recreation (2009–2015). Pratt received global recognition and established himself as a leading actor by portraying Star-Lord in six films of the Marvel Cinematic Universe, from Guardians of the Galaxy (2014) to Guardians of the Galaxy Vol. 3 (2023). He achieved further critical and commercial success by portraying Owen Grady in the first three films of the Jurassic World franchise (2015–2022). Pratt's other starring roles include the Western action film The Magnificent Seven (2016), the science fiction film Passengers (2016), and the military science-fiction action film The Tomorrow War (2021). He has also voiced roles in The Lego Movie franchise (2014–2019), Onward (2020), The Super Mario Bros. Movie (2023) and its sequel The Super Mario Galaxy Movie (2026), and The Garfield Movie (2024).

Pratt was named by Time as one of the 100 most influential people in the world in 2015, and appeared in Forbes' Celebrity 100 in 2016. Often regarded as a sex symbol, he received a star on the Hollywood Walk of Fame in 2017. Since February 2020, Pratt has owned the production company Indivisible Productions; its first project, The Terminal List, made him one of the highest-paid television actors, earning $2 million per episode.

== Early life and education ==
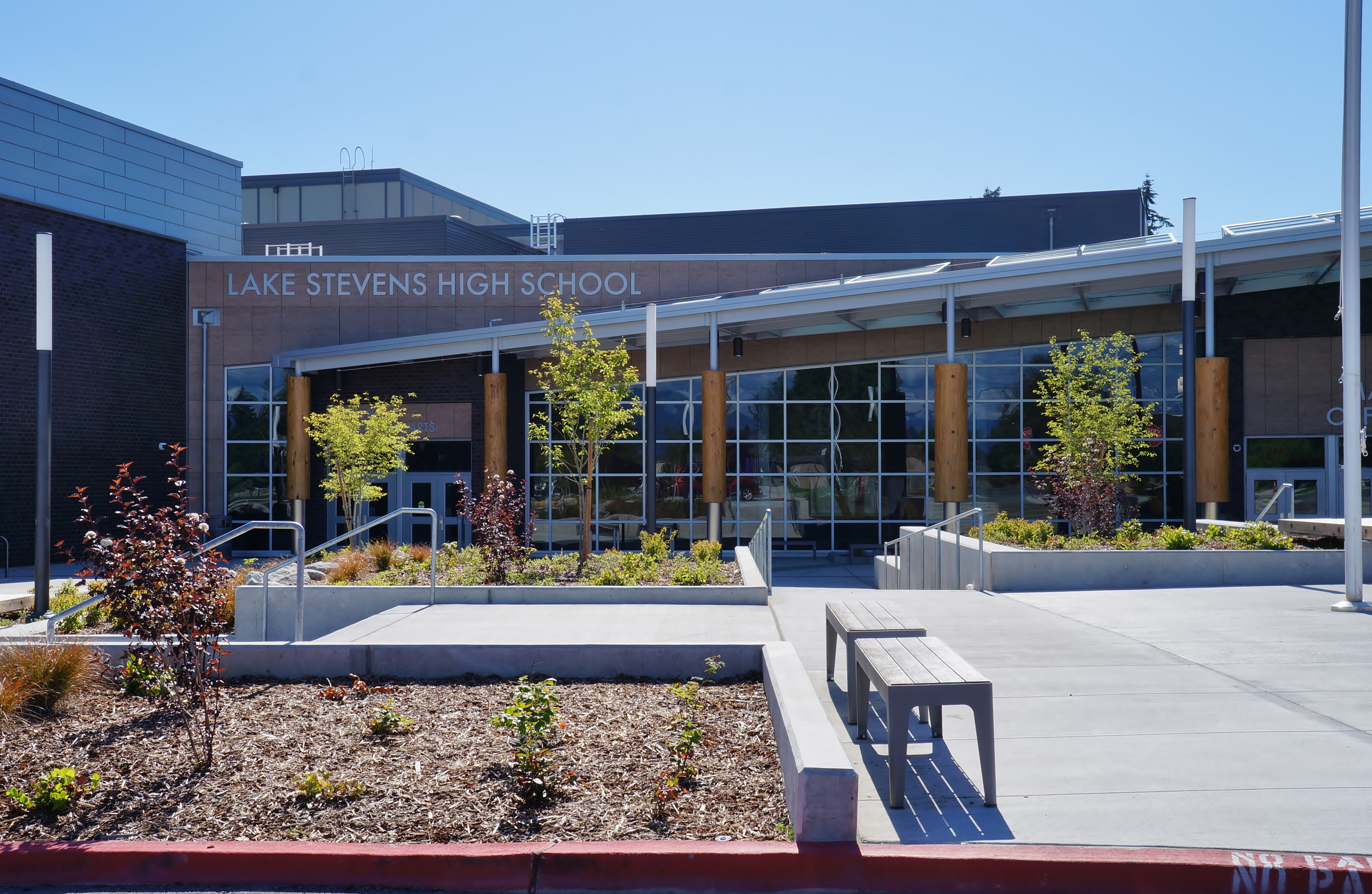
Lake Stevens High School (pictured in 2020), which Pratt attended

Christopher Michael Pratt was born in the city of Virginia, Minnesota, on June 21, 1979. His mother, Kathleen Louise "Kathy" (née Indahl), worked at a Safeway supermarket, while his father, Daniel Clifton Pratt, held various jobs, including mining and home remodeling. He has two older siblings: a sister, Angie, and a brother, Daniel "Cully" Pratt. Pratt has cited his brother Cully as one of his biggest influences and credits him as the reason he started acting. When Pratt was two or three years old, his father uprooted the family to Anchorage, Alaska, where they lived for the next few years. Concerned that raising children in Alaska was too dangerous due to the presence of bears, the family entered a period of instability, relocating between twenty homes across the United States in search of job opportunities.

When Pratt was six or seven years old, the family eventually settled in the Seattle suburb of Lake Stevens, Washington. In an interview with The Huffington Post, Pratt recalled a family vacation on a cruise where he and his brother entered a dance competition, earning him a third-place prize. As a child, he frequently danced to hip-hop music, the dance drama film Saturday Night Fever (1977), and Michael Jackson. Pratt was a frequent reader of comic books, having once won $300 in a bingo tournament and spending it all on comics. He once shared with the Los Angeles Times that his home featured a lot of art, saying, "I would try to copy these exceptional artists who could just draw male and female figures", and recalled that the walls were covered in comic book-style murals. As a teenager, Pratt showed an interest in music, listening to pop musicians like the Beatles and rappers like Tupac Shakur and Mos Def; he has cited Elvis Presley and Johnny Cash as his biggest musical influences. Around this time he began playing the guitar.

Pratt finished fifth in a state wrestling tournament during high school and competed in shot put on the track and field team. Reflecting on that time, he recalled telling his wrestling coach, "I don't know what I want to do, but I know I'll be famous and I'll make a shit ton of money". He added, "I had no idea how. I'd done nothing proactive". He graduated from Lake Stevens High School in 1997. Pratt dropped out of community college midway through his first semester and took on various jobs, including selling discount tickets and briefly working as a daytime stripper. He eventually found himself homeless in Maui, Hawaii, living out of a van and a tent on the beach. Retrospectively, he told The Independent, "It's a pretty awesome place to be homeless. We just drank and smoked weed and worked minimal hours [...] just enough to cover gas, food, and fishing supplies". While in Maui, he also worked with the Christian missionary group Jews for Jesus.

== Career ==
=== 2000–2013: Early roles and breakthrough ===
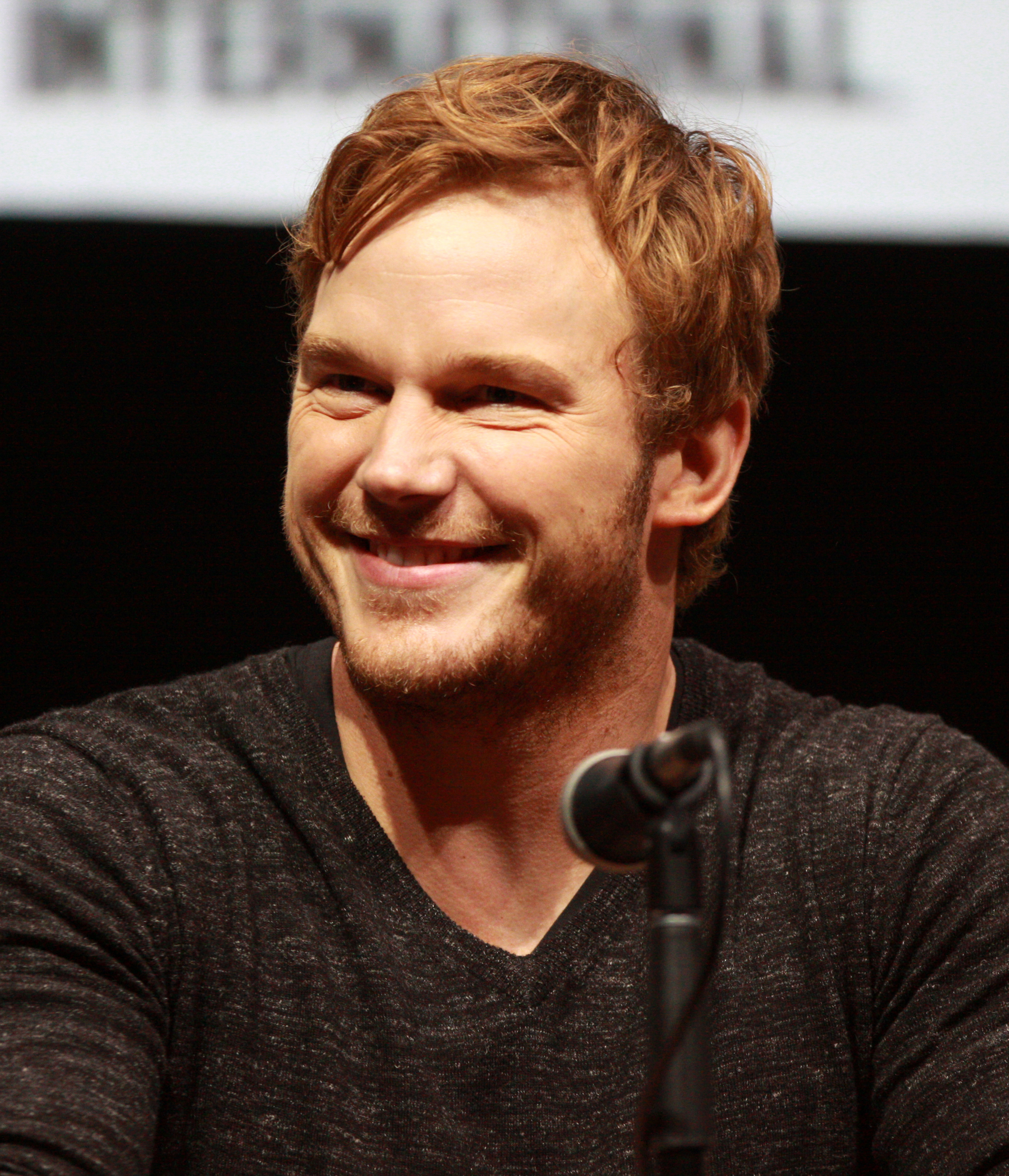
Pratt at the 2013 San Diego Comic Con International

At nineteen years old, while working as a waiter at the Bubba Gump Shrimp Company in Maui, Pratt was discovered by actress and director Rae Dawn Chong. Impressed by his charisma, she cast him in her directorial debut—a short horror film titled Cursed Part 3 (2000), in which he played Devon. According to Chong, Pratt arrived on set "early and completely prepared", and his performance "blew everyone away". Pratt credits Cursed Part 3 with teaching him the fundamentals of acting, stating that he has "no regrets about getting [his] start" in the film. Pratt's first regular television role was as Harold Brighton "Bright" Abbott in the series Everwood (2002–2006). In the fourth season of the teen drama television series The O.C. (2006–2007), Pratt portrayed the activist Winchester "Ché" Cook.

Pratt then portrayed Barry—Wesley's (James McAvoy) co-worker and unfaithful best friend—in the action thriller film Wanted (2008) and played Bobby in the comedy Wieners (2008). He played the fiancé of Emma (Anne Hathaway) in the romantic comedy Bride Wars (2009), the officer Roman Duda in the horror-comedy Jennifer's Body (2009), and the leading man role of Lester Watts in the romantic comedy Deep in the Valley (2009). The latter marked his first leading role in a comedy film. In 2009, Pratt began portraying Andy Dwyer on the NBC comedy series Parks and Recreation, a role he played until 2015. The role was initially intended as temporary, but Pratt's performance impressed the producers so much that they made him a series regular. The role ultimately became his breakthrough.

Pratt played Oakland Athletics first baseman and catcher Scott Hatteberg in the biographical sports drama film Moneyball (2011). Initially, he was told he was too overweight for the role, which he credited to the cooking of his then-girlfriend, actress Anna Faris. Determined to land the part, Pratt committed to a strict workout routine while keeping tabs on the casting process, eventually shedding 30 pounds (14 kg) within three months. Once he felt physically ready, he sent a photo to the casting director and secured the role. In Moneyball, he took on a dramatic role as a downcast baseball player and devoted father, grappling with the fear that his career was over while facing the challenging transition to a new defensive position. He regained the weight he had previously lost for his role in the high school reunion comedy 10 Years (2011), then shed it once more to portray a Navy SEAL in Zero Dark Thirty (2012).

In 2012, Pratt starred in Nicholas Stoller's romantic comedy The Five-Year Engagement. The film received mixed reviews; critic David Edelstein from Vulture stated that he had enough "sweetness to compensate for his character's adolescent japes". He later played the minor roles of Brett and Paul in the 2013 films Delivery Man and Her, respectively.

=== 2014–2018: Worldwide recognition and blockbuster films ===
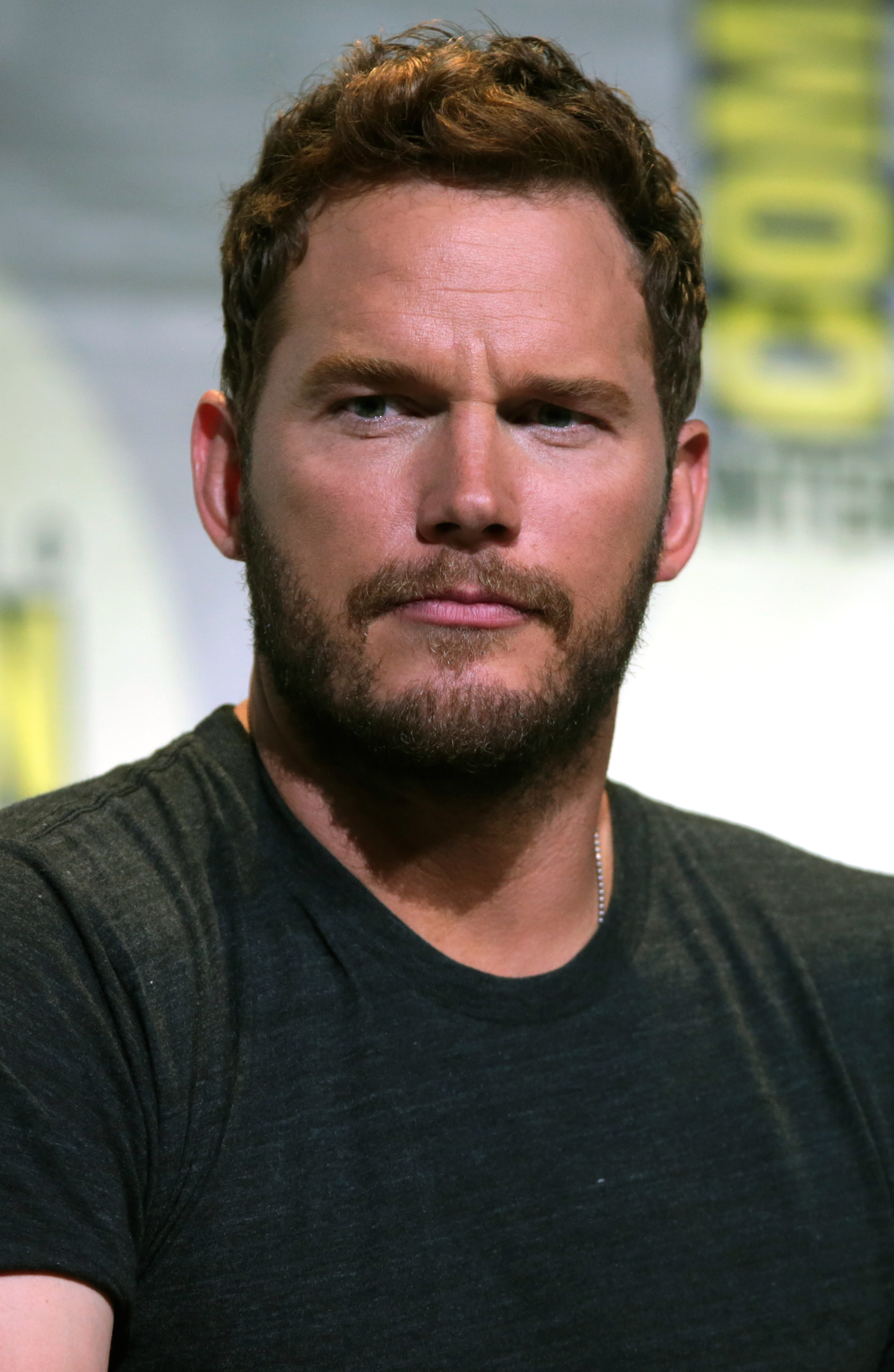
Pratt at the 2016 San Diego Comic Con International

After previously being known primarily for supporting roles, in 2014, Pratt took on leading roles in two major studio films. In June 2012, he was cast as Emmet Brickowski in the animated adventure comedy The Lego Movie (2014). He portrayed a construction worker who must stop a tyrannical businessman from gluing the Lego universe into his own rigid vision of perfection. The film was both a critical and commercial success, receiving predominantly positive reviews on Rotten Tomatoes and earning $470.7 million at the global box office.

His other major role in 2014 was portraying Peter Quill—also known as Star-Lord, a spacefaring mercenary who was abducted from Earth as a child and raised by a group of alien thieves and smugglers called the Ravagers—in Marvel Studios' Guardians of the Galaxy. Pratt initially declined the role of Star-Lord, expressing concern about experiencing "another Captain Kirk or Avatar moment," referencing previous humbling audition experiences for those roles. However, casting director Sarah Finn recommended him to director James Gunn, who had been struggling to cast the part and initially dismissed the idea. Finn arranged a meeting between the two, during which Gunn became convinced that Pratt was the ideal choice for the role. Guardians of the Galaxy ranked as the third-highest-grossing film of 2014, with a total revenue of $773.3 million. The role was included in a multi-film contract that Pratt signed with Marvel Studios. Bruce Diones of The New Yorker liked his charisma and his "love for seventies music [which] is so full of good will that he buoys the film".

In November 2013, Pratt—an enthusiastic fan of Jurassic Park (1993), which he has described as "my Star Wars"—was cast as Owen Grady in the science fiction film Jurassic World (2015), the fourth installment of the Jurassic Park film franchise. In preparation for the role, Pratt engaged in various workouts—P90X, running, swimming, boxing, and kickboxing—and increased his caloric intake to 4,000 calories daily. Jurassic World was a commercial success, grossing $1.67 billion worldwide, making it the third-highest-grossing film of all time upon release and the second-highest-grossing film of 2015. Alongside Denzel Washington, Pratt starred as Josh Faraday, a gambler and cowboy, in the action film The Magnificent Seven (2016), a remake of the 1960 Western of the same name. He later appeared in Passengers (2016), a science fiction film released in December, co-starring Jennifer Lawrence. He portrayed Jim Preston, a mechanic seeking to leave a world that no longer appears to value traditional, hands-on labor. Passengers was a commercial success, grossing $304 million worldwide.

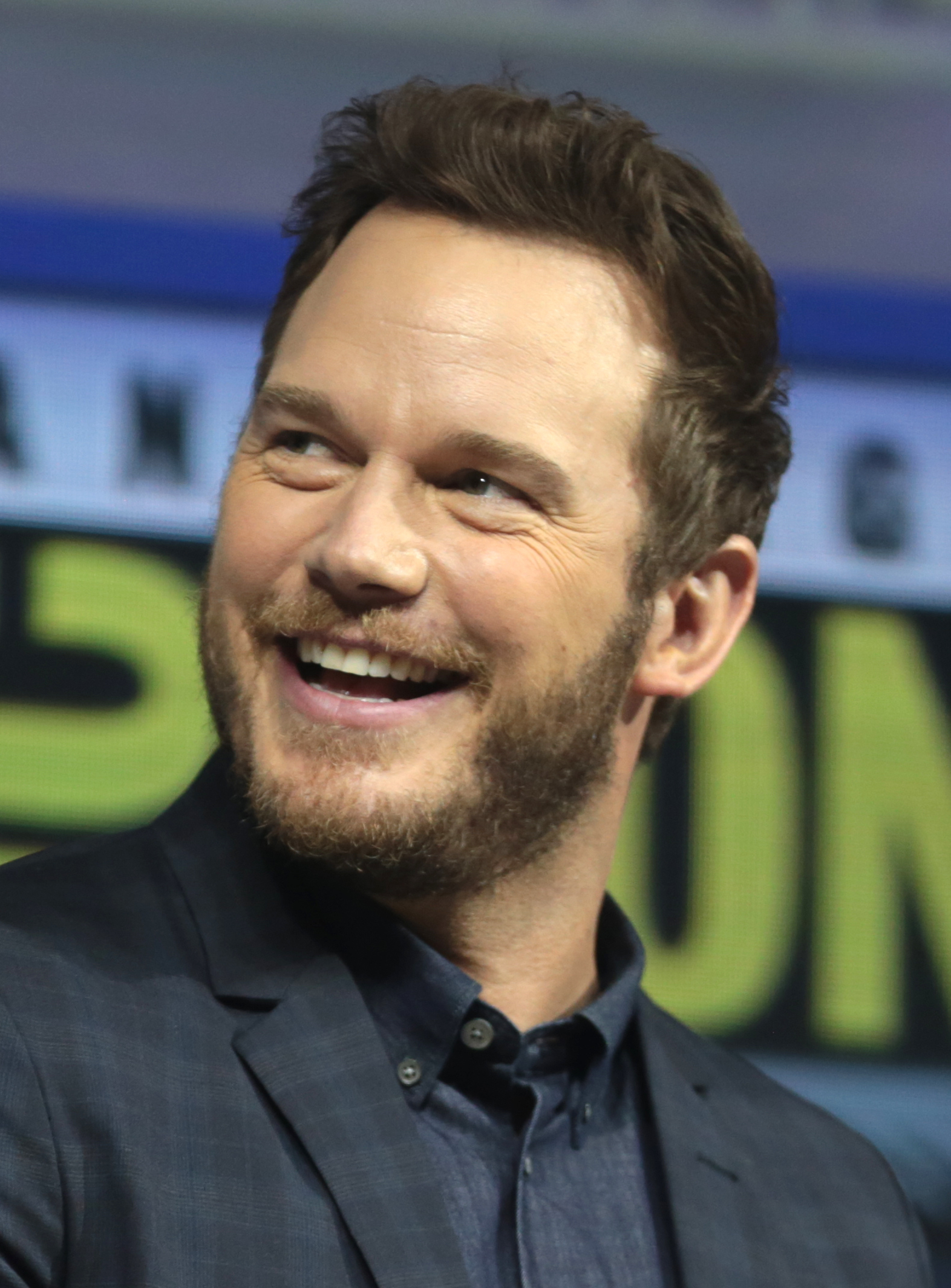
Pratt at the 2018 San Diego Comic Con International

Pratt reprised his role as Star-Lord in Guardians of the Galaxy Vol. 2 (2017). It became the eighth-highest-grossing film of 2017, having grossed $869 million on a $200 million budget. He reprised his role again as Star-Lord as part of the ensemble cast in the Russo brothers' Avengers: Infinity War (2018). Pratt described his role in the film as a "guest star" appearance and said "you get to be a little more vibrant; a little more irreverent; a little bit more colorful if you want it to be". Several social media users referred to Star-Lord as the character responsible for sabotaging events in Infinity War. Pratt himself acknowledged the criticism, admitting as much in response to the widespread sentiment. It grossed $2.052 billion, making it the highest-grossing film of 2018 and the fifth-highest-grossing film of all time from release until it was surpassed in January 2023 by Avatar: The Way of Water (2022). He then reprised his role as Owen Grady in J. A. Bayona's Jurassic World: Fallen Kingdom (2018). One of the most expensive films ever made, it became the third-highest-grossing film of 2018, grossing $1.31 billion on a budget of $432 million, but received generally negative reception.

=== 2019–present: Mixed success and production company ===
Pratt reprised his role as Emmet Brickowski in The Lego Movie 2: The Second Part (2019)—the sequel to The Lego Movie (2014). The film received generally positive reviews from critics, although the Rotten Tomatoes consensus noted that it "isn't quite as much fun as its predecessor". Despite the somewhat favorable critical reception, it underperformed at the box office. In the Western The Kid (2019), Pratt plays Grant Cutler, the villainous uncle of protagonist Rio Cutler. Pratt subsequently reprised his role as Star-Lord in Avengers: Endgame (2019), although he was not featured as part of the main ensemble cast. Endgame was the highest-grossing film of all time until it was surpassed by Avatar (2009) due to its 2021 re-release in China.

In February 2020, Pratt established his own production company, Indivisible Productions. Its first project, The Terminal List—which stars Pratt and lists him as an executive producer—premiered on Amazon Prime Video in July 2022. In March 2020, Pratt voiced one of the lead characters in the Disney and Pixar animated film Onward, alongside his Avengers co-star Tom Holland. Pratt and Parks and Recreation announced the upcoming release of a new album based on Pratt's character Andy Dwyer in May 2021. In June that same year, they officially released a pair of singles, "The Pit" and "Two Birds Holding Hands", before releasing the album Mouse Rat: The Awesome Album in August. In The Tomorrow War (2021), Pratt played the lead role of Dan Forester, a science teacher who travels into the future to help humanity fight against an alien invasion. The film received generally mixed reviews from critics, as did Pratt's performance in the film. He reprised his role as Owen Grady in Jurassic World Dominion (2022), which became the third-highest-grossing film of the year, making just over $1 billion. That same year, Pratt played Star-Lord in Thor: Love and Thunder (2022) in a non-starring role.

Pratt voiced the main character Mario in The Super Mario Bros. Movie (2023). Having grossed over $1.36 billion, it became the highest-grossing film based on a video game of all time and the second-highest-grossing film of 2023. He reprised the lead role of Star-Lord in Guardians of the Galaxy Vol. 3 (2023), which grossed $845.6 million worldwide, becoming the fourth-highest-grossing film of 2023. Pratt voiced the titular cat in the animated comedy film The Garfield Movie (2024)—his only role of the year. Despite unfavorable critical response, the film performed well at the box office. In 2025, he starred in The Electric State alongside Millie Bobby Brown. Made on a budget of $320 million, it is one of the most expensive films ever produced and Netflix's most expensive film of all time. However, it was panned by critics; some thought that the budget was wasted, while others were disappointed by the performances of the actors and direction of the Russo brothers.

In 2026, Pratt starred as a detective in the science fiction thriller film Mercy, which was a critical and commercial failure. He reprised the voice of Mario in The Super Mario Galaxy Movie. He was cast for a science fiction film titled The Traveler in November 2026.

== Acting style and public image ==
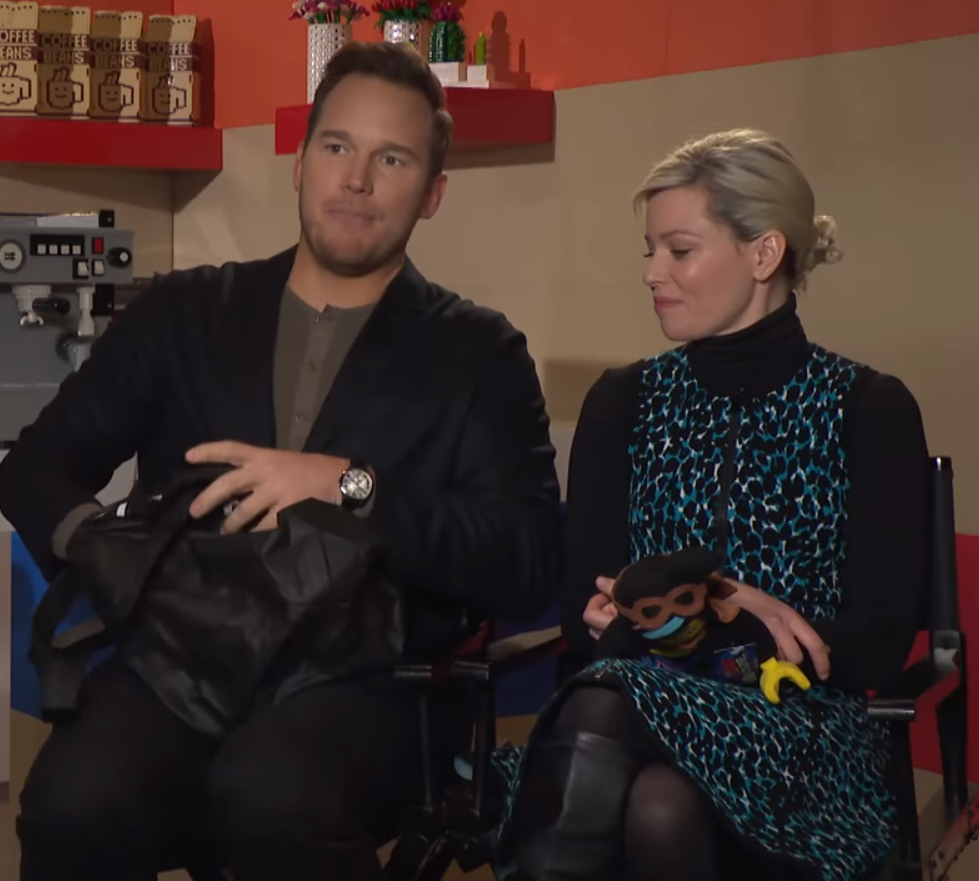
Pratt and co-star Elizabeth Banks promoting The Lego Movie 2: The Second Part (2019)

Called one of "Hollywood's biggest stars" in 2018 by CNBC, Pratt is best known for his roles in action films, though he is also well known for his roles in comedies and dramas. An A-list actor, he has become one of the world's most bankable stars through playing in big-budget, commercially successful films, often portraying charming and adventurous characters. Having grown up with a strong appreciation for music, Pratt often uses it as a tool to help him get into character. He also undergoes physical transformations, including significant weight gain or loss and intensive training, to meet the requirements of his roles.

Some critics have taken issue with him for repeatedly playing similar characters across multiple films. One such critic, Paste writer Brianna Zigler, thought that, in a 2023 review, Pratt "lacks versatility, the skill to transition from comedy to drama, and any modicum of gravitas". In 2017, Amy Nicholson of Slate dubbed him "America's new sweetheart", criticizing his "safe" screen presence that lacked the depth and complexity necessary for his cinematic roles. Other critics have thought otherwise; Screen Rant's Ben Gibbons praised Pratt for demonstrating his acting range across a variety of roles, "from action heroes to lovable goofballs", noting that he consistently stands out and resonates with audiences. The Guardian critic Alex Godfrey thought that with his "mixture of brawn and earthy charm, Pratt is increasingly coming to resemble a more contemporary Hollywood star, Harrison Ford".

Since around the time he began portraying Star-Lord, Pratt has often been labeled as a sex symbol by the media; People magazine placed him at number two on its list of the Sexiest Men Alive in 2014. In 2017, Variety's Jenelle Riley described Pratt as "one of the nicest guys in the business", a reputation the actor attributes to "[having] good parents that raised me right". However, the media began referring to him as "the worst Chris" around 2020, a label that emerged online as he was deemed the least likable among the group of Hollywood actors commonly known as the "Hollywood Chrises"—Evans, Hemsworth, Pine, and himself. Pratt himself linked the backlash to his Generation Award acceptance speech at the 2018 MTV Movie & TV Awards, in which he stated, "God is real. God loves you. God wants the best for you". TV Guide writer Kaitlin Thomas described his public persona as a combination of his on-screen charisma and a degree of candor, which at times can be seen as controversial or problematic.

In 2015, Pratt appeared in the Time 100, a compilation of the 100 most influential people in the world, as selected annually by Time magazine. That same year, Forbes ranked him as the 33rd-highest-paid actor globally, with earnings of $13 million. In 2016, he appeared in the Celebrity 100 list, a compilation of the 100 most powerful public figures in the world, as selected annually by Forbes. Also in 2016, the magazine again listed him as the sixteenth-highest-paid actor in the world, with earnings of $26 million. In 2017, Pratt was ranked the nineteenth-highest-paid actor, with earnings of $17 million. According to The Numbers, as of April 2025, his films as a leading actor have grossed over $14.1 billion worldwide, making him the fourth-highest-grossing box office film star and second-highest-grossing male actor of all time. Including all roles—leading performances, cameos, and voice acting—his films have grossed a total of $15.8 billion worldwide.

== Personal life ==
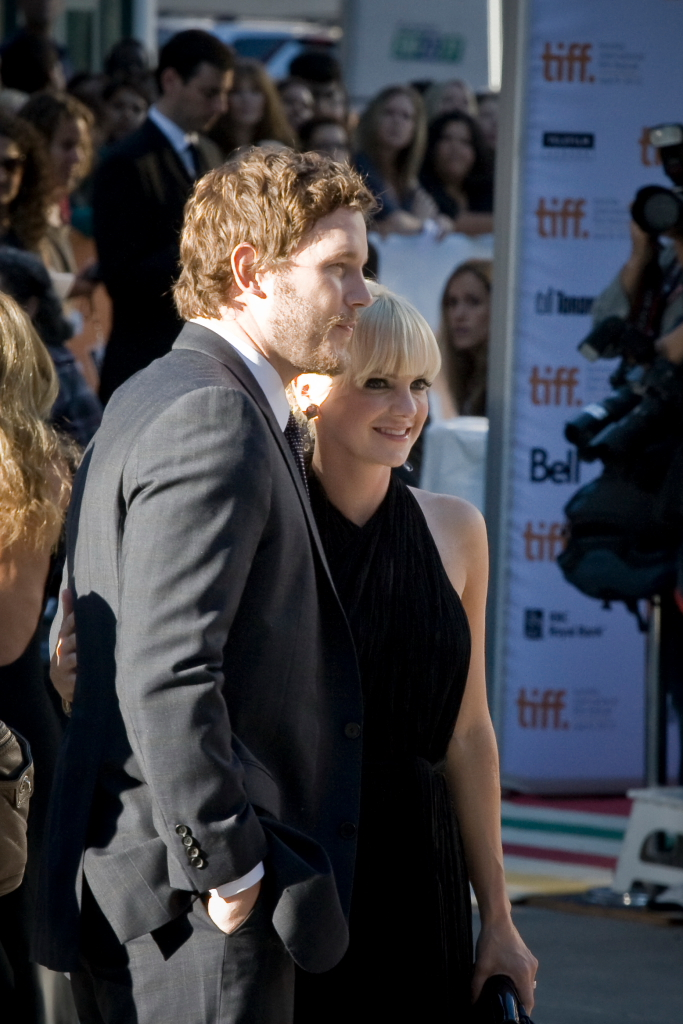
Pratt and his then-wife Anna Faris at the 2011 Toronto International Film Festival

In February 2007, while filming Take Me Home Tonight (2011), Pratt met actress Anna Faris, who portrayed his love interest in the film. The couple became engaged in late 2008 and married on July 9, 2009, in Bali, Indonesia, choosing to elope spontaneously following a friend's wedding. Pratt and Faris resided in the Hollywood Hills area of Los Angeles. Faris gave birth to their son in 2012, who was born nine weeks premature, weighing just 3 pounds 12 ounces (1.7 kg). Pratt later shared that the experience had a profound impact on his faith, stating that he and Faris "prayed a lot" during the uncertain early days of their son's life. Pratt and Faris announced their separation in August 2017. He filed for divorce on December 1, 2017, citing irreconcilable differences and requesting joint custody of their son. The divorce was finalized on October 31, 2018.

Pratt began dating author Katherine Schwarzenegger in June 2018, after being introduced by her mother, Maria Shriver of the Shriver family. On January 14, 2019, Pratt announced their engagement, and the couple married on June 8, 2019, in Montecito, California. They spent their honeymoon on the island of Lanai, Hawaii, staying at a luxury resort. The couple have three children: their first daughter was born in 2020, followed by their second daughter born in 2022, and a son in 2024. Through his marriage to Schwarzenegger, Pratt also became part of the extended Kennedy family. In 2023, Pratt and Schwarzenegger acquired the Ellwood Zimmerman House, an architecturally significant property located in Brentwood, Los Angeles. The original structure was later demolished to make way for the construction of a larger residence.

Pratt was raised in the Lutheran faith and later worked with the organization Jews for Jesus before identifying as a non-denominational Christian. He attends Zoe Church in Los Angeles, which came under public scrutiny after actor Elliot Page criticized it for allegedly being anti-LGBTQ, citing the church's connection to a pastor formerly affiliated with Hillsong Church. In response to the accusation, Pratt stated, "It has recently been suggested that I belong to a church which 'hates a certain group of people' and is 'infamously anti-LGBTQ.' Nothing could be further from the truth. I go to a church that opens their doors to absolutely everyone." Brian Houston, the founder of Hillsong Church, later clarified that Pratt had never been a member of their congregation. Director James Gunn, known for Guardians of the Galaxy (2014), also publicly defended Pratt, affirming in 2022 that he was familiar with the church Pratt attends and criticizing those calling for the actor to be recast as Star-Lord.

In 2017, Pratt stated that he does not align himself with either side of the political spectrum and expressed a desire to promote unity through finding common ground. In 2020, he and his wife, Katherine, became Global Ambassadors for the Special Olympics. In 2024, Pratt wrote an op-ed on Maria Shriver's website, Sunday Paper, regarding the 2024 United States presidential election. In it, he emphasized unity over political allegiance and avoided endorsing either candidate Kamala Harris or Donald Trump.

== Philanthropy ==
In 2015, Pratt and Faris donated $1 million to a charity that provided eyeglasses to underprivileged children. The donation was allegedly inspired by Pratt's son who was born premature and visually impaired. They also donated to the neonatal intensive care unit of the Cedars-Sinai Medical Center in Los Angeles and supported March of Dimes, which works to end premature births, birth defects, and infant mortality. That year, he and Chris Evans visited patients in the Seattle Children's Hospital after the two made a bet that eventually raised donations for the hospital as well as Christopher's Haven. In December 2016, Pratt donated $500,000 to a teen center in his hometown of Lake Stevens, which was named in memory of his father.

In February 2021, Pratt donated $20,000 to fight hunger in South Carolina. The donation was part of a fundraiser by Pratt and an organization to raise $650,000 to fight food insecurity amidst the COVID-19 pandemic in the United States. Pratt also helped create the charity Feed Thy Neighbor, to which he donated $100,000. Also in February 2021, he donated $10,000 to the Edmonds Food Bank as part of his organization and donated to the Edmonds Chamber of Commerce and Edmonds Waterfront Center in Washington state.

== Acting credits and awards ==
According to review aggregation website Rotten Tomatoes, Pratt's most acclaimed films include Moneyball (2011), Zero Dark Thirty (2012), Her (2013), The Lego Movie (2014), Guardians of the Galaxy (2014), Onward (2020), and The Guardians of the Galaxy Holiday Special (2022). His accolades include a Saturn Award, an MTV Movie Award, and an MTV Movie & TV Award.
