= Eric Ogden (photographer) =

American photographer

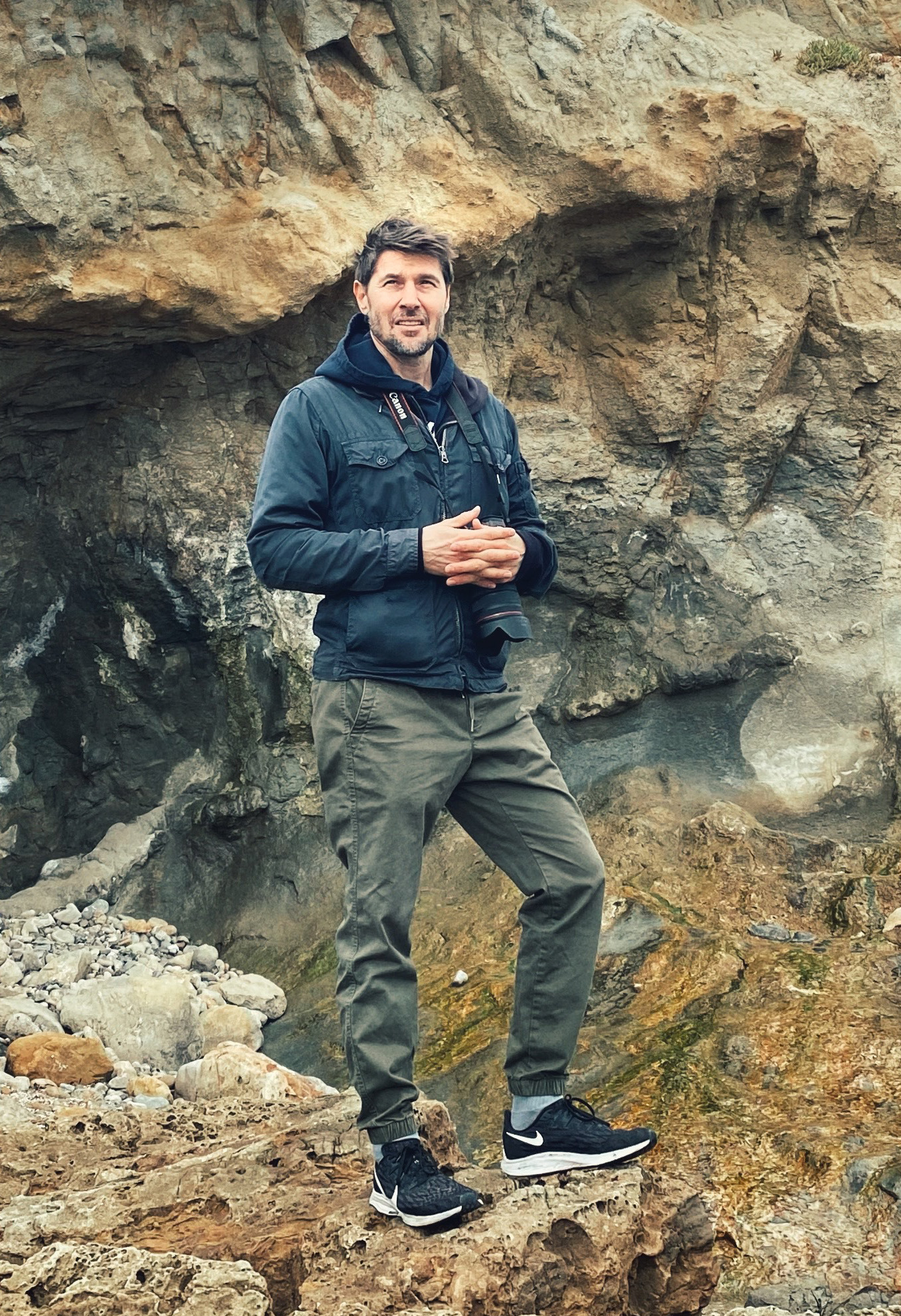
- Born: Eric Ogden; Flint, Michigan, U.S.
- Education: University of Michigan
- Occupation: Photographer
- Years active: 1999–present
- Website: www.ericogden.com

Eric Ogden is an American photographer, artist and director.

== Films ==
- Paper Boy (short)
- The Call (short)
- Nocturne (short)
- Motel (short)

== Press ==
- 2020 – "A Dystopian Vision", feature and interview, Aesthetica, June, 2020.
- 2018 – "Hidden Narratives", portfolio, Aesthetica, February, 2018.
- 2017 – "Eric Ogden's Nocturne of Fear", Motion Arts Pro, American Photography/American Illustration, May, 2017
- 2016 – "From the Desk Of: Eric Ogden", blog feature, Paper Chase Press, September, 2016.
- 2016 – "Photo of the Day", Don't Take Pictures, April, 2016.
- 2016 – "Visitors: Essay 033", portfolio, The Photographic Journal, March, 2016.
- 2016 – "Photographer Profile: Eric Ogden" profile, American Photography/American Illustration, March, 2016.
- 2016 – "Covert Presence" portfolio, Aesthetica, February/March, 2016.
- 2014 – "About That Photo of the Reformicons", The 6th Floor: Blog, The New York Times Magazine, July, 2014.
- 2013 – The F Stop Blog, interview, July 2013.
- 2012 – "Making A Great Environmental Portrait", Photo District News, February, 2012.
- 2011 – "Cinematic Portraitist Eric Ogden", LookBooks, April 18, 2011.

== Awards ==
- 2023 Webby Winner, Apps, dApps and Software, Creative Production, Frame.io Camera to Cloud. 2023 Webby Awards.
- 2023 American Photography Annual 39 – work selected & published in Annual Award book.
- 2022 – American Photography Annual 38 – work chosen for Annual Awards
- 2021 – American Photography Annual 37 – work selected & published in Annual Award book
- 2020 – Society of Publication Designers Merit Award: Documentary Photography
- 2019 – Best Editing, Grand Prize for Motel. Flickers' Rhode Island International Film Festival.
- 2019 – American Photography Annual 35
- 2017 – American Photography Annual 33
- 2015 – American Photography Annual 31
- 2014 – International Motion Art Awards 3 - for short film "The Call" starring Anna Kendrick
- 2012 – FWA Site of the Day & Adobe The Cutting Edge Project of the Week "Get Winter Ready" interactive site
- 2010 – American Photography Annual 27
- 2008 – American Photography Annual 24
- 2008 – Society of Publication Designers Award: Feature/Photography
- 2007 – American Photography Annual 23
- 2005 – Photo District News '30 Emerging Photographers to Watch'

== Solo exhibitions ==
- 2010 – A Half-Remembered Season, Hous Projects LA, West Hollywood, CA
- 2010 – A Half-Remembered Season, Hous Projects Gallery, New York City, NY

== Group exhibitions ==
- 2011 – Visions on Film, 5th Triennale der Photographie Hamburg, Hamburg, Germany
- 2010 – Versus, Hous Projects Gallery, New York City, NY
- 2009 – Character Project, Stephan Weiss Studio, New York City, NY
- 2009 – Character Project, Edison Place Gallery (PEPCO), Washington, DC
- 2009 – Character Project, Wexler Gallery, Philadelphia, PA
- 2009 – Character Project, Alan Koppel Gallery, Chicago, IL
- 2009 – Character Project, Regional Arts Commission, St. Louis, MO
- 2009 – Character Project, Chronicle Books Headquarters, San Francisco, CA
- 2009 – Character Project, ACE Gallery Beverly Hills, Los Angeles, CA
- 2006 – Dreams, Fears, Desires, Holden Luntz Gallery, Palm Beach, FL
- 2004 – Art Commerce Festival of Emerging Photographers, NY, NY

== Art Fairs ==
- 2023 EXPO Chicago. Navy Pier. Aperture Foundation booth.
- 2022 Untitled Art, Miami. Aperture Foundation booth.
- 2014 SCOPE Art Show, Miami. Luster Gallery booth.
- 2014 Paris Photo Los Angeles. Aperture Foundation booth.
- 2014 Art Palm Beach. Aperture Foundation booth.
- 2012 SCOPE Art Show, New York. Aperture Foundation booth.
- 2012 EXPO Chicago. Navy Pier Festival Hall. Aperture Foundation booth.
